= List of pharmaceutical compound number prefixes =

This list of pharmaceutical compound number prefixes provides codes used by individual pharmaceutical companies when naming their pharmaceutical drug candidates. Pharmaceutical companies generally produce large numbers of compounds in the research phase for which it is impractical to use often long and cumbersome systematic chemical names, and for which the effort to generate nonproprietary names may not be warranted, see article on drug nomenclature. Instead, these compounds are usually given a number for internal reference at the company. To distinguish the numbered compounds from different companies (or academic laboratories), each compound number is prefixed with a letter code indicating the company that developed the compound, that claims intellectual property on that compound etc. The letter code is conceived by companies themselves who should be interested in creating a unique code. Three main methods are found for prefixing the numeric identifier – with a space (gap), with nothing (concatenated), and with a dash (or hyphen).

For example, ABT-199 is a compound developed at Abbott Laboratories, and this name has been used in early publications of research results. Later the compound was assigned the International Nonproprietary Name (INN) venetoclax. Similarly, other compounds may be given a USAN or BAN for example. Finally, the compound may be given a trade name for example for marketing purposes.

A long list of code designations with corresponding trade names can be found in Appendix IV of the USP Dictionary, see article on drug nomenclature.

Note that this convention of composing compound identifiers from a company identifier followed by a number is not always followed. For example, the letter code may reflect a therapeutic/disease area or an internal project name. A randomly picked example is SC for spinal cord injury.

== A to F ==
- A – Abbott Laboratories now AbbVie
- ABT – Abbott Laboratories now AbbVie
- ABBV – AbbVie
- ACP – Acadia Pharmaceuticals
- ACH – Achillion
- ACZ – Novartis
- ADL – Adolor Corporation
- AG – Agouron Pharmaceuticals, now Pfizer La Jolla Labs
- AH – Amersham plc (Amersham Health)
- AHR – A.H. Robins
- ALS – Alantos Pharmaceuticals, acquired by Amgen in June 2007
- ALXN – Alexion
- ANX – Adventrx Pharmaceuticals
- AMG – Amgen
- APD – Arena Pharmaceuticals
- ARQ – ArQule
- ARRY Array BioPharma
- ASP – Astellas Pharma
- AT – Arecor Therapeutics
- ATB – Antibe Therapeutics
- ATL – Antisense Therapeutics Limited, Australia
- AVXS – AveXis, in May 2018 acquired by Novartis
- AY – Ayerst, later Wyeth-Ayerst, ultimately acquired by Pfizer
- AZD – AstraZeneca
- BAN – BioArctic Neuroscience AB, Sweden
- BAY – Bayer AG
- BB – Bluebird Bio
- BCX – Laboratoires Biocodex
- BI – Boehringer Ingelheim
- BIIB – Biogen
- BMS – Bristol-Myers Squibb
- BMY – Bristol-Myers Co., merging in 1989 into Bristol-Myers Squibb
- BRL – Beecham Research Labs, merged with SmithKline into SmithKline Beecham which merged into GlaxoSmithKline
- BTC – The Boots Company plc
- C – Laboratoires Cassenne
- CAM – Cambridge Antibody Technology, acquired by AstraZeneca
- CAS – Cassella Farbwerke Mainkur Aktiengesellschaft, later Hoechst, later Sanofi
- CAT – Cannasat Therapeutics Inc., renamed 2010 Cynapsus Therapeutics
- CAT – Cambridge Antibody Technology, acquired by AstraZeneca
- CC – Celgene
- CE – Pfizer
- CGS – Ciba Geigy
- CP – Pfizer. CP refers to C. P. Pharmaceuticals, a subsidiary of Pfizer
- CSL – CSL Limited, an Australian biopharmaceutical company
- CVX – CovX, acquired by Pfizer in 2008
- CYT – Cytopia of Australia, acquired by YM Biosciences, subsequently by Gilead Sciences
- D – Draco division of Astra AB, now AstraZeneca
- DMP – DuPont Merck Pharmaceuticals, a joint venture between DuPont and Merck; became DuPont Pharmaceuticals in 1998
- DPC – DuPont Pharmaceuticals, acquired by Bristol-Myers Squibb in 2001
- DS – Daiichi Sankyo
- DX – Dyax
- EAG – Eagle Pharmacy, a United States pharmaceutical compounding company
- EIDD – Emory Institute for Drug Development
- EMD – Merck KGaA (E. Merck), Darmstadt, Germany (refers to laboratory founder Emanuel Merck in Darmstadt)
- ETC – Esperion Therapeutics, acquired by Pfizer in 2003, independent again since 2008
- F – Forest Labs, acquired by Actavis
- FCE – Farmitalia-Carlo Erba, later Pharmacia AB, later Pharmacia & Upjohn, acquired by Pfizer
- FF – Fujifilm
- FG – FibroGen
- FK – Fermentek
- FPI – Fusion Pharmaceuticals
- FS – F-star

== G to L ==
- G – J. R. Geigy AG, ultimately merged into Novartis
- G – Genta Inc.
- GDC – Genentech Likely Genentech Development Candidate
- GEH – GE Healthcare
- GNE – Genentech internal reference number, company pipeline uses GDC- prefixes
- GP – Geigy, merged with CIBA in 1971 to become Ciba-Geigy, now Novartis
- GR – GlaxoSmithKline
- GS – Gilead Sciences
- GS – Gesynta Pharma
- GSK – GlaxoSmithKline
- H – Hässle division of Astra AB, now AstraZeneca
- HCV – ViroPharma
- HOE – Hoechst AG
- ICI – Imperial Chemical Industries, acquired by AkzoNobel and merged into Zeneca Group by the merger of the pharmaceutical operations. Now part of AstraZeneca
- IDN – Idun Pharmaceuticals, acquired by Pfizer
- ILY – Ilypsa, acquired by Amgen in 2007
- INNO – CytRx
- ION – Ionis
- IPI – Infinity Pharmaceuticals, Inc
- ISIS – Isis Pharmaceuticals (renamed Ionis Pharmaceuticals in 2015)
- JNJ – Johnson & Johnson
- KOS – Kosan Biosciences
- KPT – Karyopharm Therapeutics
- KU – KuDOS Pharmaceuticals
- KW – Kyowa Hakko
- L – Labaz Group, acquired by Elf Aquitaine in 1973 to form Sanofi
- LU – Lundbeck
- LY – Eli Lilly

== M to S ==
- MBX – MBX Biosciences
- MCN – McNeil Laboratories, now part of Johnson & Johnson
- MDCO – The Medicines Company
- MDL – Merrell Dow Pharmaceuticals
- MEDI – MedImmune, acquired by AstraZeneca
- MEM – Memory Pharmaceuticals
- MM – MindMed
- MRT – Monte Rosa Therapeutics
- MGX – Victory Pharma
- MK – Merck & Co. (Merck Sharp & Dohme)
- MLN – Millennium Pharmaceuticals
- MT – Micromet, acquired by Amgen in 2012
- NBI – Neurocrine Biosciences
- NC – Nycomed
- NC – Nippon Chemiphar
- NCX – NicOx
- NG – Neurogen Corp.
- NI – Neurimmune
- NKTR – Nektar Therapeutics
- NSI – Neuralstem, Inc.
- NVS – Novartis
- OCT – Octant Bio
- OGX – OncoGenex
- OPC – Otsuka Pharmaceutical Co.
- OSI – OSI Pharmaceuticals
- PD – Parke-Davis, now Pfizer
- PF – Pfizer
- PHA – Pharmacia, now Pfizer
- PNU – Pharmacia & Upjohn, now Pfizer
- PT – Pearl Therapeutics, now part of AstraZeneca
- PTI – Proteostasis Therapeutics Inc
- R – Janssen Pharmaceutica, now part of Johnson & Johnson (Janssen began as Belgian and Dutch distributor for products of Gedeon Richter Plc.)
- RDEA – Ardea Biosciences acquired by AstraZeneca
- RDX – Ardelyx
- RXC – Redx Pharma
- REGN – Regeneron Pharmaceuticals
- RLY – Relypsa
- RMI – Richardson-Merrell
- RO – Hoffmann–La Roche
- RP – ReceptorPharma
- RPC – Receptos, now Celgene
- RTI– Research Triangle Institute (mostly restricted to various phenyltropanes)
- RU – Roussel Uclaf
- RWJ – R. W. Johnson Pharmaceutical Research Institute, now part of Johnson & Johnson
- SAGE – Sage Therapeutics
- SAN – Sandoz Pharmaceuticals, now Novartis
- SB – SmithKline Beecham, now GlaxoSmithKline
- SC – G.D. Searle, now Pfizer
- SCH – Schering Corp., later Schering-Plough
- SKF – Smith, Kline & French, later merged into GlaxoSmithKline
- SLV – Solvay
- SNS – Sunesis Pharmaceuticals
- SNS – Sensei Biotherapeutics
- SPD – Shire
- SPI – Spectrum Pharmaceuticals
- SU – CIBA Pharmaceutical Company (the Summit, NJ site)
- SU – SUGEN, now Pfizer

== T to Z ==
- TAK – Takeda
- TC – Targacept Inc.
- TD – Theravance Biopharma
- TERN – Terns Pharma
- TG – Tragara Pharmaceuticals Inc., San Diego, CA
- TH – Threshold Pharmaceuticals Inc.
- TKS – Thiakis Limited, a UK biotech company (acquired by Wyeth in 2008).
- TM – TransMolecular
- TMC – Tibotec
- TNP – Takeda Neosplastic Product, from Takeda Pharmaceutical Company
- TNX – Tanox, now Genentech/Roche
- TOS – Totus Medicines
- TS – Taisho Pharmaceutical Co., a Japanese Pharmaceutical Company
- U – Upjohn (merged with Pharmacia 1995)
- UCB – UCB
- UCL – University College London
- UK – Pfizer Sandwich, UK
- USL – Upsher-Smith Laboratories
- UTE – University of Utah
- VET – Veterna S.r.l.
- VX – Vertex Pharmaceuticals
- WAY – Wyeth (Wyeth-Ayerst, acquired by Pfizer in 2009)
- WY – Wyeth (merged with Ayerst 1987)
- XL – Exelixis
- XTL – XTL Biopharmaceuticals
- XU – Sandoz Pharmaceuticals, now Novartis
- ZD – Zeneca, now AstraZeneca
- ZS – ZS Pharma, acquired by AstraZeneca
