= Joseph Schlessinger =

American biochemist (born 1945)

- יוסף שלסינגר
- Born: Josip Schlessinger; 26 March 1945 (age 81); Topusko, (present-day Republic of Croatia)
- Awards: Ciba-Drew Award (1995) Dan David Prize (2006)
- Scientific career
- Fields: Pharmacology

Joseph Schlessinger (born Josip Schlessinger; 26 March 1945) is a Yugoslav-born Israeli-American biochemist and biophysicist. He served as the chair of the Pharmacology Department at Yale University School of Medicine in New Haven, Connecticut from 2001 to 2022. He is the founding director of the school's Cancer Biology Institute. His area of research is signaling through tyrosine phosphorylation, which is important in many areas of cellular regulation, especially growth control and cancer. Schlessinger's work has led to an understanding of the mechanism of transmembrane signaling by receptor tyrosine kinases and how the resulting signals control cell growth and differentiation.

== Biography ==
Josip Schlessinger was born on 26 March 1945, in Topusko, Yugoslavia, to Jewish parents. At birth, he was wrapped in a British military parachute. He was named for his grandfather. His father, Imre, came from Slatina (Hungarian: Szalatnok), Slavonia, Kingdom of Hungary. Imre's first wife and child had been deported to Auschwitz. Schlessinger's mother, Rivka, was from Bugojno, in present-day Bosnia and Herzegovina. Her first husband had been murdered by the Ustaše. Imre and Rivka met in a labor camp on the Adriatic island of Rab in 1943 and joined a group of Jewish Partisans.

After World War II the family moved to Osijek, Croatia, where another son, Darko David, was born. Imre Schlessinger once made a joke at the expense of Tito and was sentenced to several months in jail.

The family moved to Israel in 1948. Schlessinger served his compulsory military service with the Golani Brigade and was commissioned an officer. As part of his reserve duty, he participated in the Six-Day War and the Yom Kippur War.

Schlessinger received his BSc degree in Chemistry and Physics in 1968 (magna cum laude), and an MSc degree in chemistry (also magna cum laude) in 1970 from the Hebrew University of Jerusalem.

He obtained his PhD degree in biophysics from the Weizmann Institute of Science in 1974. From 1974 to 1976, he was a postdoctoral fellow in the Departments of Chemistry and Applied Physics at Cornell University in Ithaca, New York, working with Watt W. Webb, among others. From 1977 to 1978, he was a visiting fellow in the immunology branch of the National Cancer Institute.

== Personal life ==
He is married to Irit Lax, also a professor in the pharmacology department at Yale University. They each have two children by previous marriages. In a 2009 interview with a Croatian daily newspaper Jutarnji list, he said, "Basically I am atheist. I grew up Jewish and I truly belong to the Jewish culture, but I'm not a follower of any world religion. Religion does not interest me at all."

== Academic career ==
Schlessinger was a member of the faculty of the Weizmann Institute from 1978 to 1991 and was the Ruth and Leonard Simon Professor of Cancer Research in the department of immunology from 1985 to 1991. In addition, he was a research director for Rorer Biotechnology in King of Prussia, Pennsylvania, from 1985 to 1990. In 1990, he was appointed as the Milton and Helen Kimmelman Professor and chairman of the department of pharmacology at the New York University School of Medicine. He served as director of NYU Medical Center's Skirball Institute for Biomolecular Medicine, from 1998 to 2001.

He has been the William H. Prusoff Professor and chairman of the department of pharmacology at Yale School of Medicine since 2001. He was elected to the United States National Academy of Sciences in 2000, to the American Academy of Arts and Sciences in 2001, and to the National Academy of Medicine in 2005.

He is a member of the editorial boards of several journals, including Cell, Molecular Cell, the Journal of Cell Biology, and the Science magazine Science Signaling.

== Awards and recognition ==
Schlessinger is the recipient of numerous prizes, including the Michael Landau Prize (1973), the Sara Leady Prize (1980), the Hestrin Prize (1983), the Levinson Prize (1984), a Ciba-Drew Award (1995), the Antoine Lacassagne Prize (1995), the Taylor Prize (2000), and the Dan David Prize (2006).

In 2002, he was granted an honorary doctorate from the University of Haifa. He has lectured at many institutions, including the Harvey Society (in the 1993–1994 Harvey Lectures series) and the 2006 Keith R. Porter Lecture of the American Society for Cell Biology.

In 2009, he was elected as a Member of the Croatian Academy of Sciences and Arts.

In 2012, the Hope Funds for Cancer Research selected Schlessinger to receive its Award of Excellence for Clinical Development. In 2009, Schlessinger was given an award by then-President of Croatia Stjepan Mesić for outstanding service in promoting Croatia in the international scientific community and for the contribution within Croatian biomedical sciences.

In September 2003, The Guardian listed him as number 14 in the "Giants of Science". He received, along with Charles Sawyers and Tony Hunter, the 2014 BBVA Foundation Frontiers of Knowledge Award in the Biomedicine category for "carving out the path that led to the development of a new class of successful cancer drugs."

== Publications and research ==
According to PubMed, Schlessinger has authored over 450 scientific original and review articles in the areas of pharmacology, molecular biology, biochemistry, and structural biology, mostly on tyrosine kinase signaling. Tyrosine kinase signaling plays a critical role in the control of many cellular processes including cell proliferation, differentiation, metabolism, as well as cell survival and migration.

Tyrosine kinases play a particularly important role in cancer, and several agents that block their activity are now used as anti-cancer drugs, such as Imatinib or Gleevec. Among his contributions are the findings that cell surface receptors with tyrosine kinase activity signal across membrane by forming dimers when they bind to their growth factor activators. He discovered this in studies of the epidermal growth factor receptor (EGFR). He was also instrumental in understanding how the SH2 domain controls tyrosine kinase signaling by binding to phosphorylated tyrosines in activated receptors. One of the seminal findings in this work was his laboratory's cloning of Grb2 and other Adaptor proteins.

Another is the lab's cloning of FRS2, which is critical for signaling by the Fibroblast growth factor receptor. In 2001, he was ranked by the ISI Highly Cited as one of the world's top 30 most cited scientists (across all fields) in the 1990s. According to ISI, his papers have been cited a total of 76,699 times.

=== Select publications ===
- A Ullrich; Schlessinger, Joseph (1990). "Signal transduction by receptors with tyrosine kinase activity". Cell. 61 (2): 203–12. doi:10.1016/0092-8674(90)90801-k. PMID 2158859. Wikidata Q27860624.
- Lemmon, Mark; Schlessinger, Joseph (2010). "Cell signaling by receptor tyrosine kinases". Cell. 141 (7): 1117–34. doi:10.1016/j.cell.2010.06.011. PMC 2914105. PMID 20602996. Wikidata Q24598357.
- Bollag, Gideon; Peter Hirth; James Tsai; et al. (2010). "Clinical efficacy of a RAF inhibitor needs broad target blockade in BRAF-mutant melanoma". Nature. 467 (7315): 596–9. doi:10.1038/nature09454. PMC 2948082. PMID 20823850. Wikidata Q24597152.

== Controversy ==
In 2006, a sexual harassment lawsuit was initiated against Yale University by Schlessinger's former secretary, Mary Beth Garceau, who alleged numerous episodes of harassment during her employment at Yale and claimed Yale University failed to act upon her frequent complaints, causing her to resign. The case was settled out of court in mid-2007 and the terms of the settlement were not publicly disclosed.

== SUGEN ==
In 1991, Schlessinger co-founded (with Axel Ullrich and Steven Evans-Freke) the biotechnology company SUGEN to develop ATP-like molecules that would compete with ATP for binding to the catalytic site of receptor tyrosine kinases in cancer treatment. In 1999, Sugen was acquired by Pharmacia & Upjohn for $650 million and in 2003, Pharmacia was acquired by Pfizer. One of the pipeline products (SU11248) was ultimately developed by Pfizer as Sutent (Sunitinib), approved by the FDA for treating gastrointestinal stromal tumors and renal cell carcinoma.

== Plexxikon ==
In 2001, Schlessinger co-founded Plexxikon with Sung-Hou Kim (University of California, Berkeley). Plexxikon, uses a pioneering structural biology-based platform for drug discovery. In April 2011, Plexxikon was acquired by the Japanese pharmaceutical company Daiichi Sankyo for $805 million and an additional $130 million in potential milestone payments.

== Kolltan Pharmaceuticals ==
In 2007, Schlessinger co-founded Kolltan Pharmaceuticals with Arthur Altschul Jr. Kolltan Pharmaceuticals is an early-stage biotech that develops antibodies to treat solid tumors.

In April 2014, Kolltan received $60 million in equity financing. In September 2014, Kolltan filed for an IPO and in January 2015, they withdrew the IPO. In November 2016, Celldex Therapeutics acquired Kolltan for $235 million.
