= Äkta Explorer =

The ÄKTA explorer was the first high end FPLC (Fast Protein Liquid Chromatography) system that was developed for Life Science research by the Swedish company Pharmacia in 1994. Its purpose was to simplify and automatize protein purification. It was followed by a line of similar devices (the "Äkta" line). The product line name was transferred together with the sale of Pharmacia first to Amersham and then to GE Healthcare. Although protein purification is possible with a large range of chromatographic devices, the Äkta line represents together with BioRad's NGC line the only devices that were specifically designed for this purpose both from the hardware and software perspective. Main users of these devices are the pharmaceutical industry and academic researchers.
