= Semaxanib =

Chemical compound

Clinical data
- ATC code: none

Identifiers
- IUPAC name: (3Z)-3-[(3,5-dimethyl-1H-pyrrol-2-yl)methylidene]-1,3-dihydro-2H-indol-2-one
- CAS Number: 194413-58-6
- PubChem CID: 5329098
- IUPHAR/BPS: 5056
- ChemSpider: 4486260
- UNII: 71IA9S35AJ
- ChEBI: CHEBI:91083
- ChEMBL: ChEMBL276711
- CompTox Dashboard (EPA): DTXSID801025708

Chemical and physical data
- Formula: C_{15}H_{14}N_{2}O
- Molar mass: 238.290 g·mol^{−1}
- 3D model (JSmol): Interactive image
- SMILES: O=C2C(\c1ccccc1N2)=C/c3c(cc([nH]3)C)C
- InChI: InChI=1S/C15H14N2O/c1-9-7-10(2)16-14(9)8-12-11-5-3-4-6-13(11)17-15(12)18/h3-8,16H,1-2H3,(H,17,18)/b12-8-; Key:WUWDLXZGHZSWQZ-WQLSENKSSA-N

Semaxanib (INN, codenamed SU5416) is a tyrosine-kinase inhibitor drug designed by SUGEN as a cancer therapeutic. It is an experimental stage drug, not licensed for use on human patients outside clinical trials. Semaxanib is a potent and selective synthetic inhibitor of the Flk-1/KDR vascular endothelial growth factor (VEGF) receptor tyrosine kinase. It targets the VEGF pathway, and both in vivo and in vitro studies have demonstrated antiangiogenic potential.

== Research ==
In February 2002, Pharmacia, the then-parent of Sugen, prematurely ended phase III clinical trials of semaxinib in the treatment of advanced colorectal cancer due to discouraging results. Other studies, at earlier phases, have since been conducted. However, due to the prospect of next-generation tyrosine kinase inhibitors and the inefficacy of semaxanib in clinic trials, further development of the drug has been discontinued. A related compound, SU11248 (sunitinib), was further developed by Sugen and subsequently by Pfizer, and received FDA approval for treatment of renal carcinoma in January 2006.

When combined with chronic exposure to hypoxia, SU5416 induces severe pulmonary hypertension in mice and rats. This property has been exploited to develop a series of useful, though controversial, rodent models of pulmonary arterial hypertension, the first and best characterized being the Sugen/Hypoxia (SuHx) mouse model.

== Synthesis ==

A Vilsmeier–Haack reaction on 2,4-dimethylpyrrole (1) gives the aldehyde (2). Knoevenagel condensation of this intermediate with oxindole (3) in the presence of base yields semaxanib.

== See also ==
- Toceranib
