= Substrate (biology) =

Surface on which a plant or animal lives

In biology, a substrate is the surface on which an organism (such as a plant, fungus, or animal) lives. A substrate can include biotic or abiotic materials and animals. For example, encrusting algae that lives on a rock (its substrate) can be itself a substrate for an animal that lives on top of the algae. Inert substrates are used as growing support materials in the hydroponic cultivation of plants. In biology substrates are often activated by the nanoscopic process of substrate presentation.

== In agriculture and horticulture ==
- Cellulose substrate
- Expanded clay aggregate (LECA)
- Rock wool
- Potting soil
- Soil

== In animal biotechnology ==
=== Requirements for animal cell and tissue culture ===
Requirements for animal cell and tissue culture are the same as described for plant cell, tissue and organ culture (In Vitro Culture Techniques: The Biotechnological Principles). Desirable requirements are (i) air conditioning of a room, (ii) hot room with temperature recorder, (iii) microscope room for carrying out microscopic work where different types of microscopes should be installed, (iv) dark room, (v) service room, (vi) sterilization room for sterilization of glassware and culture media, and (vii) preparation room for media preparation, etc. In addition the storage areas should be such where following should be kept properly : (i) liquids-ambient (4–20 °C), (ii) glassware-shelving, (iii) plastics-shelving, (iv) small items-drawers, (v) specialized equipments-cupboard, slow turnover, (vi) chemicals-sidled containers.

=== For cell growth ===
There are many types of vertebrate cells that require support for their growth in vitro otherwise they will not grow properly. Such cells are called anchorage-dependent cells. Therefore, many substrates which may be adhesive (e.g. plastic, glass, palladium, metallic surfaces, etc.) or non-adhesive (e.g. agar, agarose, etc.) types may be used as discussed below:

- Plastic as a substrate. Disposable plastics are cheaper substrate as they are commonly made up of polystyrene. After use they should be disposed of properly. Before use they are treated with gamma radiation or electric arc simply to develop charges on the surface of substrate. After cell growth its rate of proliferation should be measured. In addition, the other plastic materials used as substrate are teflon or polytetrafluoroethylene (PTFE), thermamox (TPX), polyvinylchloride (PVC), polycarbonate, etc. Monolayer of cell must be grown. Moreover, plastic beads of polystyrene, sephadex and polyacrylamide are also available for cell growth in suspension culture.
- Glass as a substrate. Glass is an important substrate used in laboratory in several forms such as test tubes, slides, coverslips, pipettes, flasks, rods, bottles, Petri dishes, several apparatus, etc. These are sterilized by using chemicals, radiations, dry heat (in oven) and moist heat (in autoclave).
- Palladium as a substrate. For the first time palladium deposited on agarose was used as a substrate for growth of fibroblast and glia.
