= Energon =

Energon may refer to:

- Energon, a fictional fuel and power source in the Transformers universe
  - Transformers: Energon, an anime series named after said power source in the Transformers stories
- Energon (Dungeons & Dragons), a group of monster species in the Dungeons & Dragons role-playing game
- Phospho-Energon, a medicinal concoction produced in Sweden
