= Superose =

Superose is a trade name for a collection of FPLC columns which are used in the automated separation of biological molecules. The different columns provided can separate a variety of macromolecules, ranging from small peptides and polysaccharides to DNA strands and entire viruses. The material inside the column is agarose based, meaning that it consists of sugars that are crosslinked to form a gel-like mass. The pores in this material have different sizes, and if a molecule is too big, it does not fit into the pores, meaning that it follows a shorter way to the end of the column.

The columns are placed in a holder, and a computerized pumping system pumps a watery solution, often a buffer through the column. A special injection loop allows the injection of the desired sample.

== See also ==
- Size exclusion
- Sepharose
- Sephadex
