= Alpha-neoagaro-oligosaccharide hydrolase =

Identifiers
- EC no.: 3.2.1.159
- CAS no.: 60063-77-6

Databases
- IntEnz: IntEnz view
- BRENDA: BRENDA entry
- ExPASy: NiceZyme view
- KEGG: KEGG entry
- MetaCyc: metabolic pathway
- PRIAM: profile
- PDB structures: RCSB PDB PDBe PDBsum
Search
- PMC: articles
- PubMed: articles
- NCBI: proteins

Alpha-neoagaro-oligosaccharide hydrolase (EC 3.2.1.159, alpha-neoagarooligosaccharide hydrolase, alpha-NAOS hydrolase) is an enzyme with systematic name alpha-neoagaro-oligosaccharide 3-glycohydrolase. This enzyme catalyses the following chemical reaction

Hydrolysis of the (1->3)-alpha-L-galactosidic linkages of neoagaro-oligosaccharides that are smaller than a hexamer, yielding 3,6-anhydro-L-galactose and D-galactose

When neoagarohexaose is used as a substrate, the oligosaccharide is cleaved at the non-reducing end to produce 3,6-anhydro-L-galactose and agaropentaose, which is further hydrolysed to agarobiose and agarotriose.
