= C11H12N4O3S =

The molecular formula C_{11}H_{12}N_{4}O_{3}S (molar mass: 280.30 g/mol, exact mass: 280.0630 u) may refer to:

- Sulfalene
- Sulfamethoxypyridazine
- Sulfametoxydiazine
