= C22H25FN4O2 =

The molecular formula C_{22}H_{25}FN_{4}O_{2} (molar mass: 396.458 g/mol, exact mass: 396.1962 u) may refer to:

- PX-2
- Toceranib
