= FPLC =

FPLC may refer to:

- Fast protein liquid chromatography, a technique used to separate or purify proteins from complex mixtures
- Patriotic Forces for the Liberation of Congo (French: Forces Patriotiques pour la Libération du Congo), the military wing of the Union of Congolese Patriots
- French Protestant Church of London
- Franklin Pierce Law Center, a law school located in Concord, New Hampshire, USA
- Full Product Life Cycle (see Systems Development Life Cycle)
