= Sepharose =

Sepharose is a tradename for a crosslinked, beaded-form of agarose, a polysaccharide polymer material extracted from seaweed. Its brand name is a portmanteau derived from Separation-Pharmacia-Agarose. A common application for the material is in chromatographic separations of biomolecules.

Sepharose is a registered trademark of Cytiva (formerly: GE Healthcare and Pharmacia, Pharmacia LKB Biotechnology, Pharmacia Biotech, Amersham Pharmacia Biotech, and Amersham Biosciences).

Various grades and chemistries of sepharose are available. Iodoacetyl functional groups can be added to selectively bind cysteine side chains and this method is often used to immobilize peptides. Sepharose/agarose, combined with some form of activation chemistry, is also used to immobilize enzymes, antibodies and other proteins and peptides through covalent attachment to the resin. Common activation chemistries include cyanogen bromide (CNBr) activation and reductive amination of aldehydes to attach proteins to the agarose resin through lysine side chains.

== See also ==
- Gel permeation chromatography
- Superose
- Sephadex
