= SUGEN =

Drug discovery company

SUGEN (Sugen) was a drug discovery company focused on development of protein kinase inhibitors. It was founded in 1991, and shut down in 2003, after developing the pioneering kinase inhibitor drug sunitinib (Sutent).

== Early history and focus ==
Sugen was founded in 1991 in Redwood City, California, by veteran biotech investor Stephen Evans-Freke and kinase researchers Joseph Schlessinger and Axel Ullrich. The name was derived from the initials of Schlessinger and Ullrich, and the "GEN" for Genetics. Sugen developed small-molecule inhibitors of protein kinases, key enzymes in signal transduction and cellular decision-making. The main focus was on oncology, though the company had collaborations in other therapeutic areas. The concept of inhibiting kinases by small molecules that mimicked the ATP structure was generally thought to be infeasible when the company was founded (due to the high (mM) concentration of ATP in cells), and Sugen has been credited with pioneering this area, leading to protein kinases being the second most active area of drug development, largely based on ATP-competitive inhibitors. Sugen also had research programs on protein phosphatases, none of which led to therapeutics.

== Research and drug development ==
Sugen went public in October 1994 (NASDAQ: SUGN). In 1997, it filed its first Investigational New Drug (IND) application, for a PDGFR inhibitor, SU101. This failed clinically, but was followed by a different series of compounds that inhibited VEGFR kinases (involved in angiogenesis) as well as PDGFR and Kit. Of these, SU5416 (Semaxanib) and SU6668 went into clinical trials for colon cancer in 1999. SU5416 proceeded to Phase 3 trials, while the follow-on compound, SU11248 (Sunitinib) was later approved for human use, and a related compound SU11654 (Toceranib) was approved for canine tumors.

Sugen was funded through a number of collaborative research programs with companies including ASTA Medica (pan-Her and Raf programs), Allergan (ophthalmic angiogenesis inhibition), Zeneca (EGFR and cancer), and Amgen all of which took equity stakes in the company, and Taiho (cancer). Conversely, Sugen was an investor in and collaborator with Selectide for the development of peptide kinase inhibitors.

== Mergers ==
Sugen was acquired by Pharmacia & Upjohn in 1999 in a stock swap valued at $650 million. In December 1999, Pharmacia & Upjohn merged with Monsanto. The company was renamed Pharmacia in 2002. Pharmacia was then acquired by Pfizer in April 2003.

== Shutdown and legacy ==
The Pfizer-Pharmacia merger lead to major cuts in research activities, including the shut-down of Sugen over the course of 2003, with the loss of approximately 350 employees. Pfizer continued the phase 3 trials and development of SU11248, now known as Sutent (sunitinib), leading to Food and Drug Administration approval in January 2006 for treatment of RCC and GIST tumors. Other programs also transferred to Pfizer, including a follow-on compound to SU11248, known as SU14813, and programs on Met and PAK kinases. Work started at Sugen also contributed to the development of the ALK inhibitor crizotinib (Xalkori), FDA-approved for NSCLC in 2011. Sugen also generated extensive basic research on kinase biology, including the publication of almost 300 research papers, the definition of the human kinome, and the discovery of over 140 human kinase genes. Sugen alumni have gone on to major positions in other pharmaceutical and kinase-focused companies. In 2010, Sutent surpassed $1bn in annual revenues for Pfizer.
