= Mastocytoma =

Small tumor composed of mast cells

- Other names: Mast cell tumor
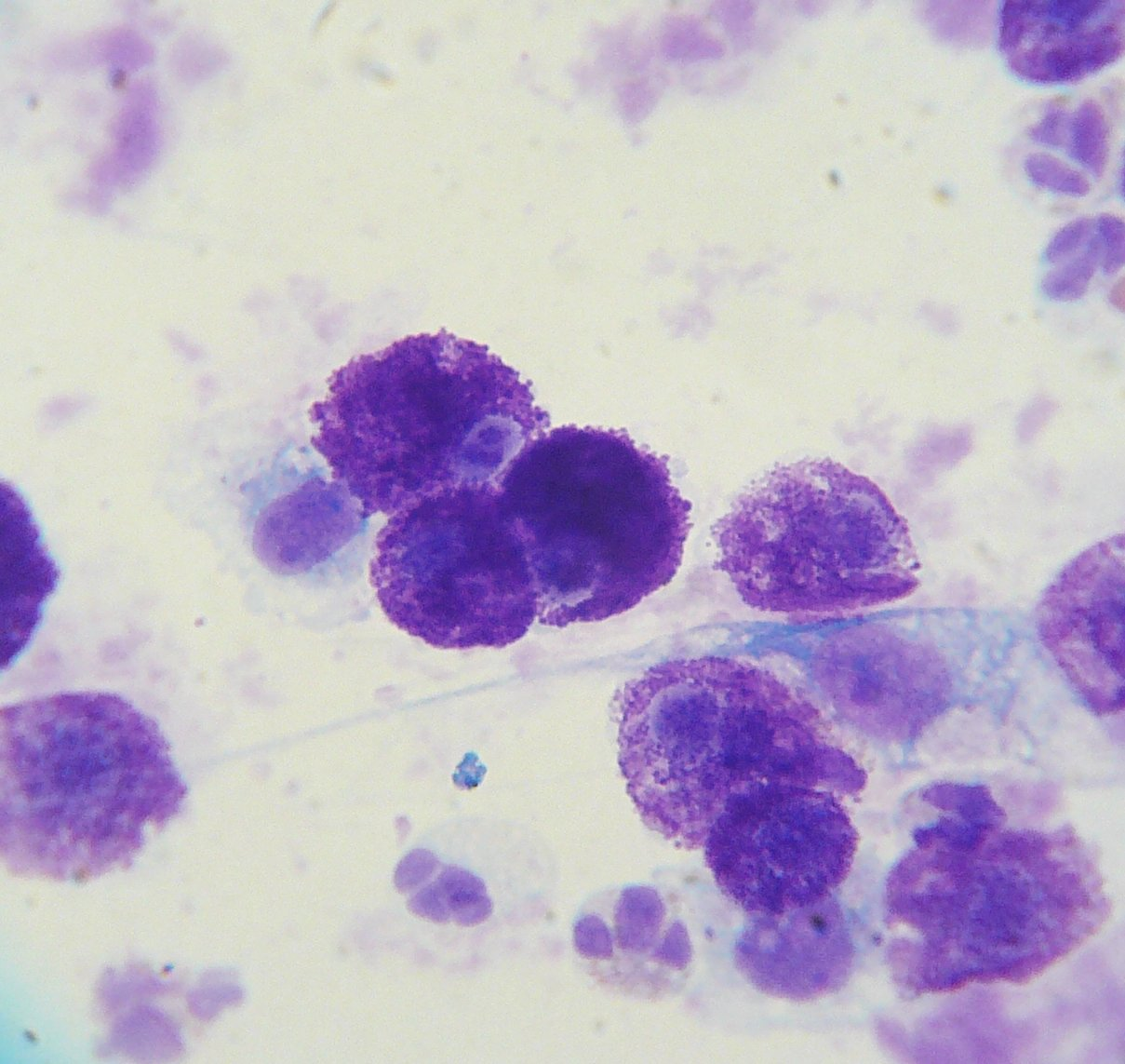
- Mast cell tumor cytology
- Specialty: Oncology

A mastocytoma or mast cell tumor is a type of round-cell tumor consisting of mast cells. It is found in humans and many animal species; the term also can refer to an accumulation or nodule of mast cells that resembles a tumor.

Mast cells originate from the bone marrow and are normally found throughout the connective tissue of the body as normal components of the immune system. As they release histamine, they are associated with allergic reactions. Mast cells also respond to tissue trauma. Mast cell granules contain histamine, heparin, platelet-activating factor, and other substances. Disseminated mastocytosis is rarely seen in young dogs and cats, while mast cell tumors are usually skin tumors in older dogs and cats. Although not always malignant, they do have the potential to be. Up to 25 percent of skin tumors in dogs are mast cell tumors, with a similar number in cats.

== Signs and symptoms ==
=== Humans ===
When mastocytomas affect humans, they are typically found in skin. They usually occur as a single lesion on the trunk or wrist. Although it is rare, mastocytomas are sometimes found in the lung. It can also affect children.

=== Animals ===
Mast cell tumors are known among veterinary oncologists as 'the great pretenders' because their appearance can be varied, from a wart-like nodule to a soft subcutaneous lump (similar on palpation to a benign lipoma) to an ulcerated skin mass. Most mast cell tumors are small, raised lumps on the skin. They may be hairless, ulcerated, or itchy. They are usually solitary, but in about six percent of cases, there are multiple mast cell tumors (especially in Boxers and Pugs).

Manipulation of the tumor may result in redness and swelling from release of mast cell granules, also known as Darier's sign, and prolonged local hemorrhage. In rare cases, a highly malignant tumor is present, and signs may include loss of appetite, vomiting, diarrhea, and anemia. The presence of these signs usually indicates mastocytosis, which is the spread of mast cells throughout the body. Release of a large amount of histamine at one time can result in ulceration of the stomach and duodenum (present in up to 25 percent of cases) or disseminated intravascular coagulation. When metastasis does occur, it is usually to the liver, spleen, lymph nodes and bone marrow.

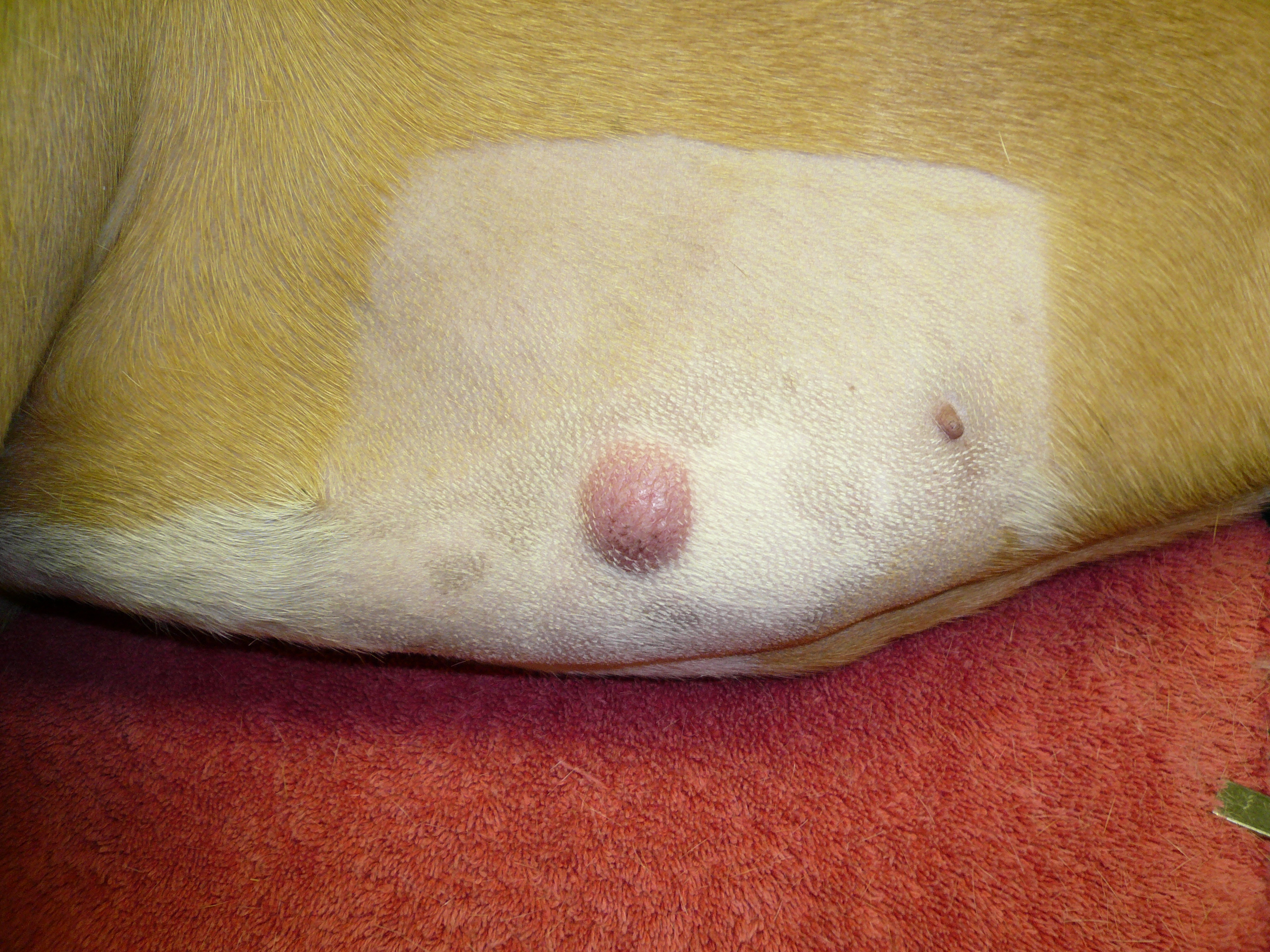
Mast cell tumor on the side of a dog

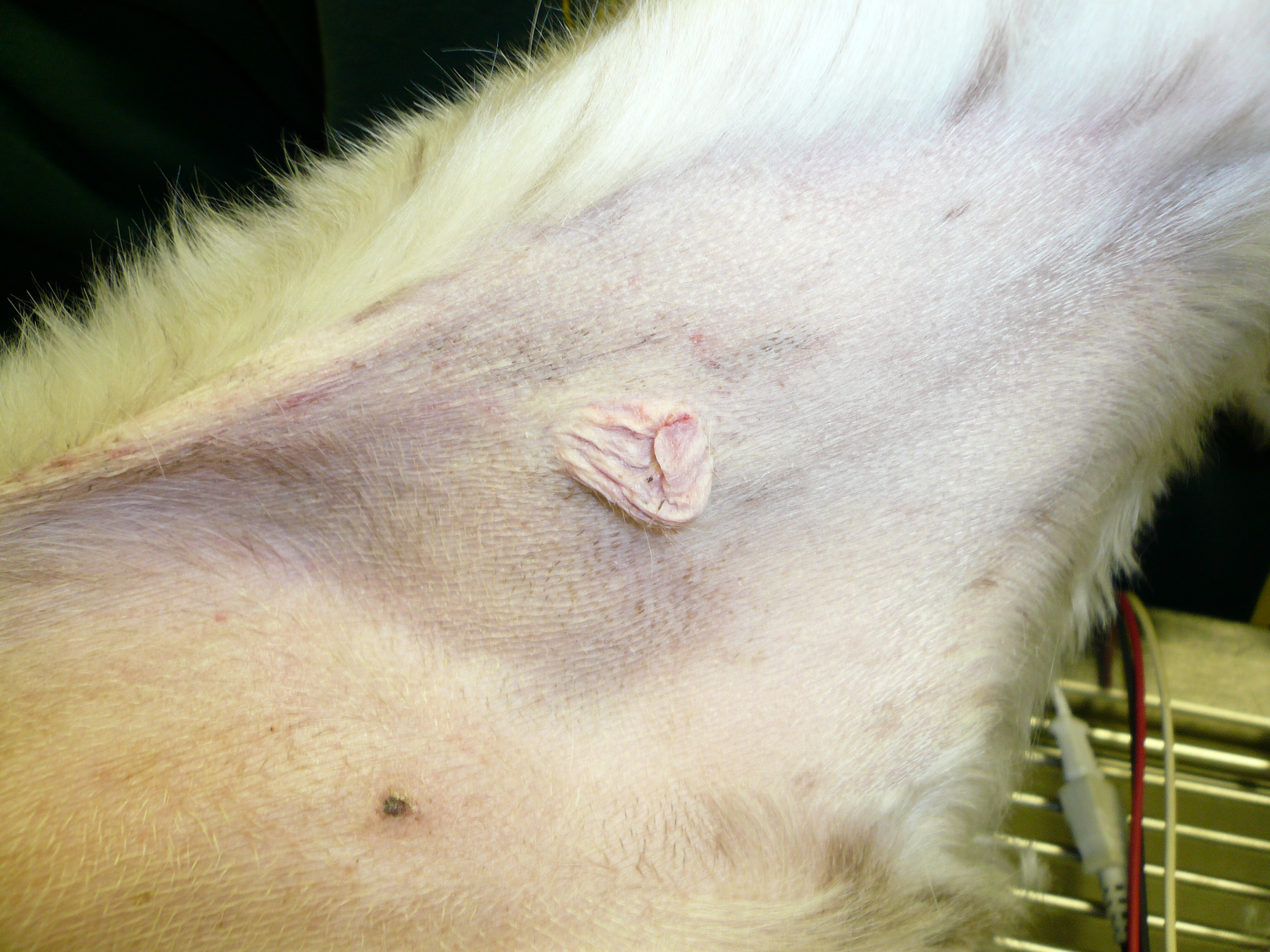
Mast cell tumor on the inner thigh of a dog

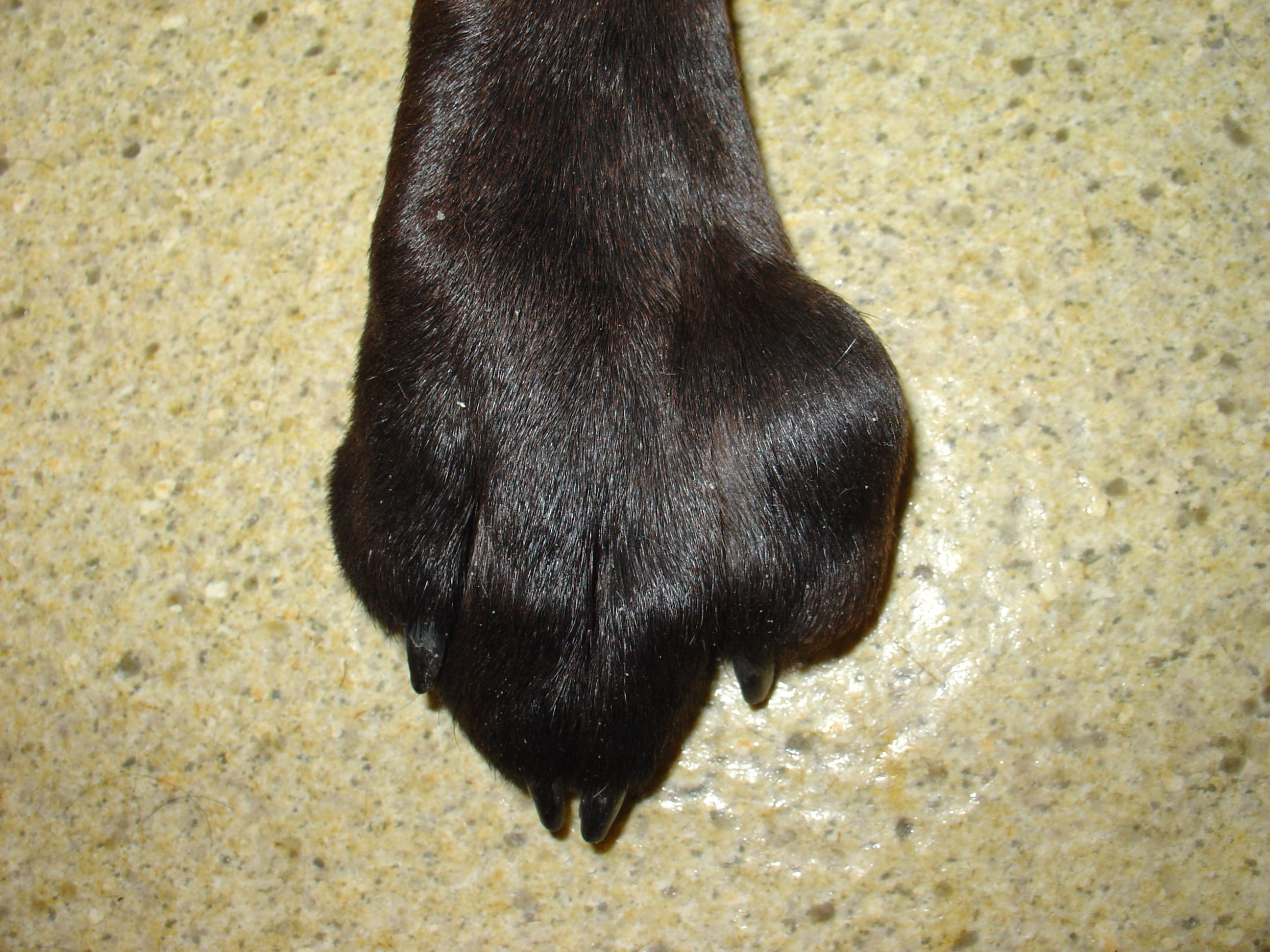
Mast cell tumor of the paw

== Diagnosis ==
A needle aspiration biopsy of the tumor will typically show a large number of mast cells. This is sufficient to make the diagnosis of a mast cell tumor, although poorly differentiated mast cells may have few granules and thus are difficult to identify. The granules of the mast cell stain blue to dark purple with a Romanowsky stain, and the cells are medium-sized. However, a surgical biopsy is required to find the grade of the tumor. The grade depends on how well the mast cells are differentiated, mitotic activity, location within the skin, invasiveness, and the presence of inflammation or necrosis.

- Grade I – well differentiated and mature cells with a low potential for metastasis
- Grade II – intermediately differentiated cells with potential for local invasion and moderate metastatic behavior
- Grade III – undifferentiated, immature cells with a high potential for metastasis

However, there is a significant amount of discordance between veterinary pathologists in assigning grades to mast cell tumors due to imprecise criteria.

The disease is also staged according to the WHO system:

- Stage I - a single skin tumor with no spread to lymph nodes
- Stage II - a single skin tumor with spread to lymph nodes in the surrounding area
- Stage III - multiple skin tumors or a large tumor invading deep to the skin with or without lymph node involvement
- Stage IV – a tumor with metastasis to the spleen, liver, or bone marrow, or with the presence of mast cells in the blood

X-rays, ultrasound, or lymph node, bone marrow, or organ biopsies may be necessary to stage the disease.

== Treatment and prognosis ==
Removal of the mast cell tumor through surgery is the treatment of choice. Antihistamines, such as diphenhydramine, are given prior to surgery to protect against the effects of histamine released from the tumor. Wide margins (two to three centimeters) are required because of the tendency for the tumor cells to be spread out around the tumor. If complete removal is not possible due to the size or location, additional treatment, such as radiation therapy or chemotherapy, may be necessary. Prednisone is often used to shrink the remaining tumor portion. H2 blockers, such as cimetidine, protect against stomach damage from histamine. Vinblastine and lomustine are common chemotherapy agents used to treat mast cell tumors.

Toceranib and masitinib, examples of receptor tyrosine kinase inhibitors, are used in the treatment of canine mast cell tumors. Both were recently approved by the U.S. Food and Drug Administration (FDA) as dog-specific anticancer drugs.

Grade I or II mast cell tumors that can be completely removed have a good prognosis. One study showed about 23 percent of incompletely removed grade II tumors recurred locally. Any mast cell tumor found in the gastrointestinal tract, paw, or on the muzzle has a guarded prognosis. Previous beliefs that tumors in the groin or perineum carried a worse prognosis have been discounted. Tumors that have spread to the lymph nodes or other parts of the body have a poor prognosis. Any dog showing symptoms of mastocytosis or with a grade III tumor has a poor prognosis. Dogs of the Boxer breed have a better than average prognosis because of the relatively benign behavior of their mast cell tumors. Multiple tumors that are treated similarly to solitary tumors do not seem to have a worse prognosis.

Mast cell tumors do not necessarily follow the histological prognosis. Further prognostic information can be provided by AgNOR stain of histological or cytological specimen. Even then, there is a risk of unpredictable behavior.

== Other animals ==
Mast cell tumors are an uncommon occurrence in horses. They usually occur as benign, solitary masses on the skin of the head, neck, trunk, and legs. Mineralization of the tumor is common. In pigs and cattle, mast cell tumors are rare. They tend to be solitary and benign in pigs and multiple and malignant in cattle. Mast cell tumors are found in the skin of cattle most commonly, but these may be metastases from tumors of the viscera. Other sites in cattle include the spleen, muscle, gastrointestinal tract, omentum, and uterus.

=== Dogs ===
Mast cell tumors mainly occur in older adult dogs, but have been known to occur on rare occasions in puppies. The following breeds are commonly affected by mast cell tumors:

- Boxer
- Staffordshire Bull Terrier
- Bulldog
- Basset Hound
- Weimaraner
- Boston Terrier
- Great Dane
- Golden Retriever
- Labrador Retriever
- Beagle
- German Shorthaired Pointer
- Scottish Terrier
- Pug
- Shar Pei
- Rhodesian Ridgeback

=== Cats ===
Two types of mast cell tumors have been identified in cats, a mast cell type similar to dogs and a histiocytic type that appears as subcutaneous nodules and may resolve spontaneously. Young Siamese cats are at an increased risk for the histiocytic type, although the mast cell type is the most common in all cats and is considered to be benign when confined to the skin.

Mast cell tumors of the skin are usually located on the head or trunk. Gastrointestinal and splenic involvement is more common in cats than in dogs; 50 percent of cases in dogs primarily involved the spleen or intestines. Gastrointestinal mast cell tumors are most commonly found in the muscularis layer of the small intestine, but can also be found in the large intestine. It is the third most common intestinal tumor in cats, after lymphoma and adenocarcinoma.

Diagnosis and treatment are similar to that of the dog. Cases involving difficult to remove or multiple tumors have responded well to strontium-90 radiotherapy as an alternative to surgery. The prognosis for solitary skin tumors is good, but guarded for tumors in other organs. Histological grading of tumors has little bearing on prognosis.
