= Axel Ullrich =

German cancer researcher

- Born: 19 October 1943 (age 82); Lauban, Silesia
- Education: University of Tübingen; University of Heidelberg; University of California, San Francisco
- Known for: Sunitinib
- Awards: Wolf Prize in Medicine (2010)
- Scientific career
- Institutions: Max Planck Institute of Biochemistry; Genentech

Axel Ullrich (born 19 October 1943) is a German cancer researcher and has been the director of the molecular biology department at the Max Planck Institute of Biochemistry in Martinsried, Germany since 1988. This department's research has primarily focused on signal transduction. Ullrich has received Hamdan Award for Medical Research Excellence, awarded by Sheikh Hamdan bin Rashid Al Maktoum Award for Medical Sciences, Dubai, United Arab Emirates in 2008 and Ullrich and his team received the Wolf Prize in 2010.

== Education ==
Ullrich received his primary degree in biochemistry at the University of Tübingen, Germany, he received a Ph.D. from the University of Heidelberg in molecular genetics in 1975.

== Career ==
Ullrich completed post-doctoral work at the University of California, San Francisco, from 1975 to 1977 and worked as a senior scientist at Genentech in San Francisco from 1978 to 1988. From 1988, he has been at the Max Planck Institute of Biochemistry.

Ullrich was the first person to clone a human gene, insulin, into E. coli. He was one of the first employees of Genentech. While working for Genentech in 1979, he obtained a human insulinoma tissue sample from a surgeon in Munich. The tumor had just been extracted from a woman. Ullrich purified the insulin mRNA from this sample and cloned it into a vector that he inserted into E. coli. Thus, he produced a strain of E. coli that would manufacture human insulin.

He was one of several scientific leaders of 200+ scientists in developing the anti-cancer drug Trastuzumab (trade name: Herceptin) at Genentech, and has co-founded five biotech companies, Axxima, U3 Pharma, Kinaxo, SUGEN (acquired by Pfizer) and Blackfield.

He is listed by the Institute for Scientific Information (ISI) as a highly cited biologist and he is also in the top ten of H-index of living biologists. Among many other achievements, he and his team have co-discovered two groups of receptor tyrosine kinases. In some tumours, (the cancerous state), some receptor tyrosine kinases tend to be over-active, due to genetic changes.

Ullrich is also Principal Investigator of Singapore Oncogenome Project at the Institute of Medical Biology aimed at identifying all oncogenic alterations in all protein tyrosine kinase (PTK) gene transcripts of a large number of tumor cell lines and primary tumors. The laboratory also focuses on functional characterization and, in cooperation with clinical oncologists, investigation of the clinical relevance of the newly discovered PTK oncogenes which serves as basis for the development of novel multi-targeted drugs.

The discovery of the drug Sunitinib and clarification of the multi-specific mechanism of action is partly based on discoveries of Axel Ullrich and his team at the Max Planck Institute of Biochemistry in the 1980s in Munich. The discovery, medical and pharmaceutical development as well as clinical testing of the drug was carried out by about 100+ scientists and physicians, at SUGEN, a company co-founded in 1991 by Ullrich, and the Max Planck Society, and other investors.

Sunitinib inhibits cellular signaling by targeting multiple receptor tyrosine kinases (RTKs). These include all receptors for platelet-derived growth factor (PDGFR) and vascular endothelial growth factor receptors (VEGFR), which play a role in both tumor angiogenesis and tumor cell proliferation. The simultaneous inhibition of these targets therefore leads to both reduced tumor vascularization and cancer cell death, and ultimately tumor shrinkage.

In the early 1990s, Ullrich and his team identified the signaling system involved in regulating tumor angiogenesis, the growth of blood vessels in tumors. He and his team discovered that inhibiting a key player in the signaling system (called vascular endothelial growth factor receptor or VEGFR) suppresses the generation of blood vessels in tumors and slows down cancer cell growth. Years later, a small molecule inhibitor of the VEGFR2 kinase function was developed, from which a derivative was approved in 2006 for the treatment of kidney carcinoma and gastro-intestinal stromal tumors.

== Honors and awards ==
- 2005 Otto Warburg Medal
- 2008 Pezcoller Foundation-AACR International Award for Extraordinary Achievement in Cancer Research
- 2008 Hamdan Award for Medical Research Excellence – Therapy in Malignancy
- 2009 Debrecen Award for Molecular Medicine
- 2009 Emanuel Merck Lectureship
- 2010 Wolf Prize research on human proto-oncogenes and development of novel cancer therapies.
- 2012 Honorary Doctor of Semmelweis University
- 2013 Elected Member of the Hungarian Academy of Sciences
- 2019 Lasker-DeBakey Clinical Medical Research Award.
