= Novartis-Drew Award =

The Novartis-Drew Award for Biomedical Research is an award jointly presented by Novartis and Drew University. It comprises a cash award (originally $2000) and a plaque. The award was initially created as the Ciba-Drew Award for Biomedical Research and renamed following the change of company name from Ciba-Geigy to Novartis in 1996.

== Incomplete list of winners ==
Novartis-Drew Award

- 2003: Elaine Fuchs; Philip A. Sharp; David Botstein
- 2002: Frank McCormick; Brian J. Druker; Harold Varmus
- 2001: Sidney Brenner; Eric Lander; Craig Venter
- 2000: Susan L. Lindquist
- 1999: Elizabeth Helen Blackburn; Joan Steitz
- 1998: Tom Maniatis; Alexander Varshavsky
- 1997: Edward Alan Berger

Ciba-Drew Award

- 1996: H. Robert Horvitz; Stanley J. Korsmeyer
- 1995: Joseph Schlessinger; Günter Blobel; Arnold J. Levine
- 1994: Thomas R. Cech; Albert Eschenmoser; Manfred Eigen
- 1993: Leroy Hood; Francis S. Collins
- 1992: Stuart L. Schreiber; Peter G. Schultz; Richard Lerner
- 1991: Sir Michael Berridge
- 1990: Roger David Kornberg; Nicholas R. Cozzarelli
- 1989: Robert William Mahley
- 1988: Samuel Broder; Robert C. Gallo; Luc Montagnier
- 1987: Thomas A. Waldmann
- 1986: Michael H. Wigler
- 1985: Jean-Pierre Changeux; Solomon Halbert Snyder
- 1984: Albrecht Fleckenstein; Harald Reuter
- 1983: Ronald Levy;
- 1982:
- 1981: C. Ronald Kahn; Donald F. Steiner; Sydney Brenner
- 1980: Bengt I. Samuelsson; John Robert Vane
- 1979: Paul Greengard
- 1978:
- 1977: Robert C. Gallo; Fred Rapp

== See also ==
- List of biochemistry awards
