= Toceranib =

Chemical compound used in the treatment of tumors

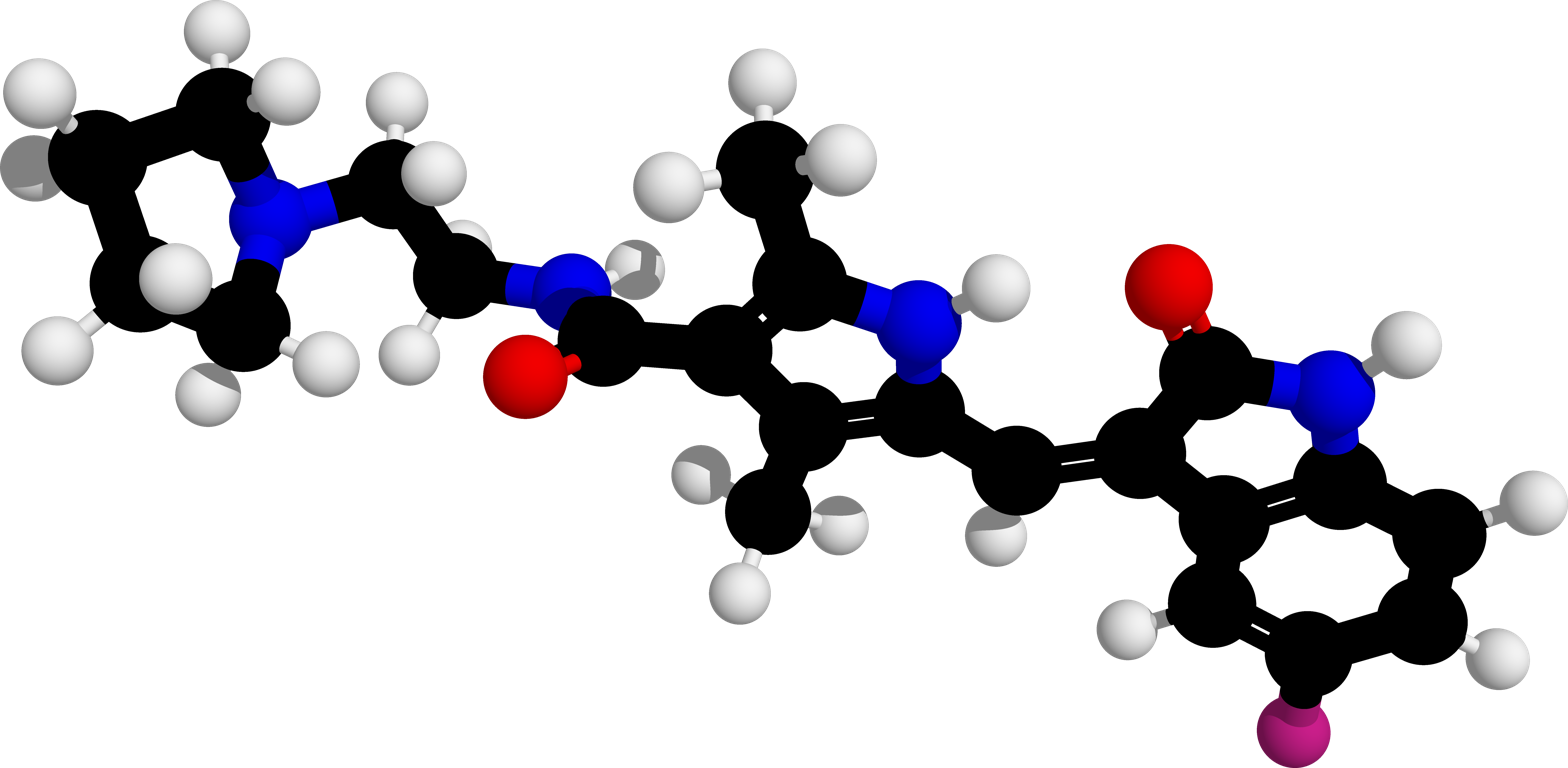

Clinical data
- Trade names: Palladia
- AHFS/Drugs.com: Veterinary Use
- License data: US DailyMed: Toceranib
- Routes of administration: By mouth
- Drug class: Antineoplastic
- ATCvet code: QL01EX90 (WHO)

Legal status
- Legal status: CA: ℞-only; US: ℞-only; EU: Rx-only

Pharmacokinetic data
- Bioavailability: 77%
- Protein binding: 91%-93%
- Elimination half-life: 16 h

Identifiers
- IUPAC name: 5-[(5Z)-(5-fluoro-2-oxo-1,2-dihydro-3H-indol-3-ylidene)methyl]-2,4-dimethyl-N-[2-(pyrrolidin-1-yl)ethyl]-1H-pyrrole-3-carboxamide
- CAS Number: 356068-94-5; as salt: 874819-74-6
- PubChem CID: 5329106; as salt: 16034840
- ChemSpider: 4486268; as salt: 13163443
- UNII: 59L7Y0530C; as salt: 24F9PF7J3R
- KEGG: D08503; as salt: D08544
- ChEMBL: ChEMBL13608; as salt: ChEMBL2103833
- PDB ligand: BWC (PDBe, RCSB PDB)
- CompTox Dashboard (EPA): DTXSID50189076

Chemical and physical data
- Formula: C_{22}H_{25}FN_{4}O_{2}
- Molar mass: 396.466 g·mol^{−1}
- 3D model (JSmol): Interactive image
- SMILES: Fc1ccc2c(c1)/C(C(=O)N2)=C/c4c(c(C(=O)NCCN3CCCC3)c([nH]4)C)C
- InChI: InChI=1S/C22H25FN4O2/c1-13-19(12-17-16-11-15(23)5-6-18(16)26-21(17)28)25-14(2)20(13)22(29)24-7-10-27-8-3-4-9-27/h5-6,11-12,25H,3-4,7-10H2,1-2H3,(H,24,29)(H,26,28)/b17-12-; Key:SRSGVKWWVXWSJT-ATVHPVEESA-N

Toceranib (INN), sold under the brand name Palladia, is a receptor tyrosine kinase inhibitor that is used in the treatment of canine mast cell tumor also called mastocytoma. It is the first medication developed specifically for the treatment of cancer in dogs. It is used as its phosphate salt, toceranib phosphate. It was developed by SUGEN as SU11654, a sister compound to sunitinib, which was later approved for human therapies. Toceranib is a tyrosine kinase inhibitor and works in two ways: by killing tumor cells and by cutting off the blood supply to the tumor.

The most common side effects include diarrhea, decrease or loss of appetite, lameness, weight loss, and blood in the stool.

== Veterinary uses ==
Toceranib is indicated to treat canine cutaneous (skin-based) mast cell tumors, a type of cancer responsible for about one out of five cases of canine skin tumors. It is approved to treat the tumors with or without regional lymph node involvement.
