= Phospho-Energon =

Swedish drug

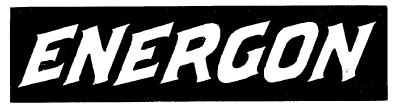
Energon logo

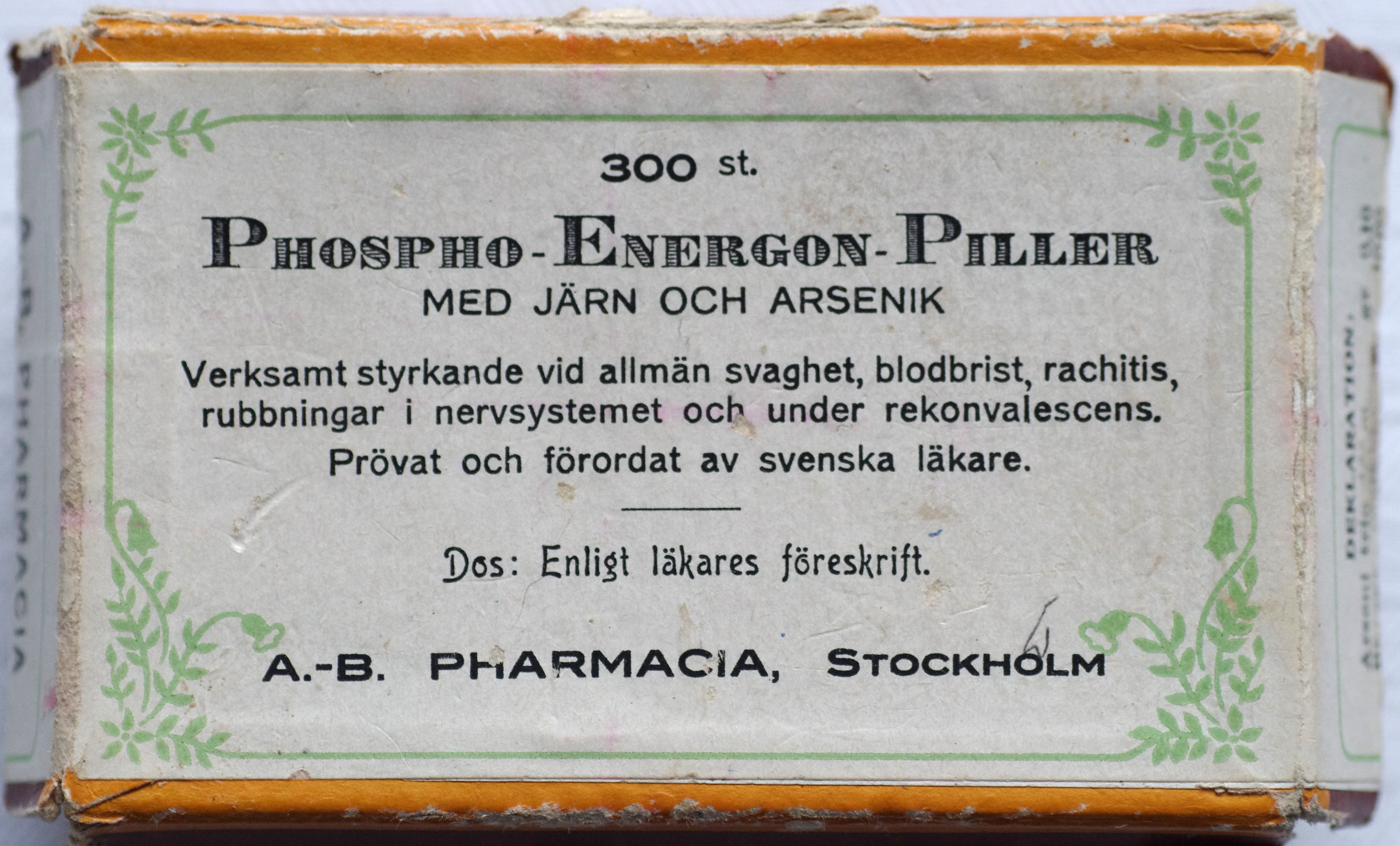
Phospho-Energon-Piller, "med järn och arsenik" (with iron and arsenic), box of 300 pills, marketed by A.-B. Pharmacia

Phospho-Energon, often just called Energon, was a "miracle medicine" produced and distributed in Sweden. With the incomes generated by the Energon sales, the emerging Swedish pharmaceutical company Pharmacia (founded in 1911 out of the Elgen pharmacy in central Stockholm) was able to establish itself in the market and begin pharmaceutical research and the production of other medicines, eventually becoming a major actor in the Swedish and international pharmaceutical sectors.

The main ingredients of Energon were calf's brain, sugar, and milk. Initially, the drug was sold as a powder to be mixed with liquid, but later pills were produced.

The product was said to have a "safe and rapid effect against general debility, lack of appetite, nervous tension, exhaustion, and sleeping problems". The drug was also used against blood deficiency and disturbances in the neural system. Moreover, the advertisement of Pharmacia claimed that consumption of Energon would relieve the user of fear of traffic, through the soothing of the nerves.

In early advertisements, Pharmacia claimed that the drug was endorsed by Swedish physicians. Moreover, the company stressed that its production was conducted under the scrutiny of professor Karl Albert Vesterberg.

The permit to sell the Phospho-Energon pills in Swedish pharmacies lapsed in 1936. The permits to sell four variations of the Phospho-Energon pills (with arsenic, iron and kola extracts) in Swedish pharmacies lapsed in 1943.

The preparation Phospho-Energon with kola contained the following ingredients:

Dried cow brain; Dried kola extract; Ferrous tartrate; Calcium pantothenate; Choline; Copper sulphate; Licorice; Nicotinamide; Pyridoxine; Riboflavin; Thiamine
