= Upjohn =

American pharmaceutical manufacturing firm (1886–1995)

The Upjohn Company
- Traded as: NYSE: UPJ
- Industry: Pharmaceutical
- Founded: 1886; 140 years ago
- Defunct: 1995; 31 years ago
- Fate: Merged with Pharmacia to form Pharmacia & Upjohn
- Successor: Pharmacia & Upjohn; Viatris
- Headquarters: Portage, Michigan, U.S.

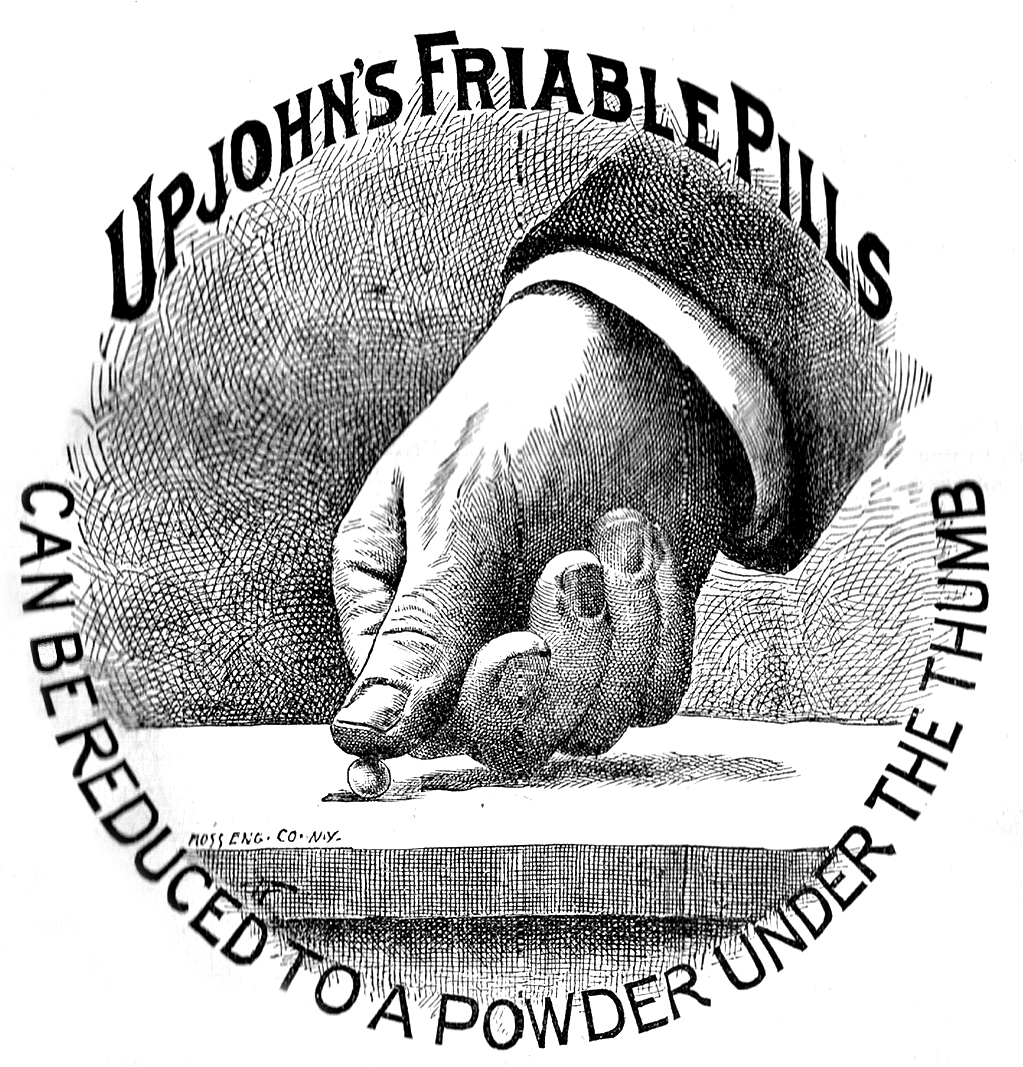
Logo of Upjohn Pill & Granule, later The Upjohn Company

The Upjohn Company was an American pharmaceutical manufacturing firm (est. 1886) in Hastings, Michigan, by Dr. William E. Upjohn, an 1875 graduate of the University of Michigan medical school. The company was originally formed to make friable pills, specifically designed to crush easily, and thus be easier for patients to digest. Upjohn initially marketed the pills to doctors by sending them a wooden plank along with a rival’s pill and one of Upjohn’s, with instructions to try to hammer the pills into the plank.

== History ==
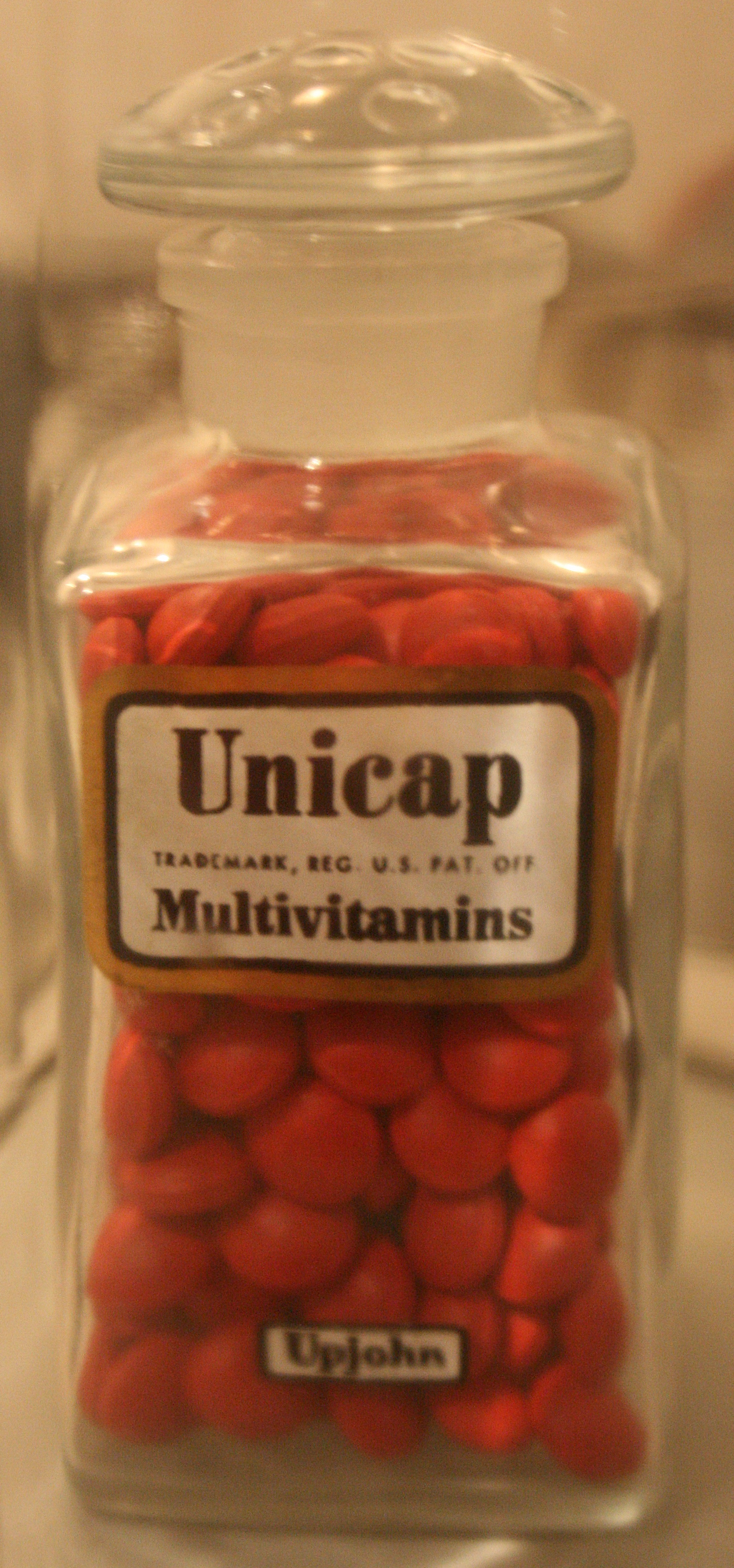
Unicap, a multivitamin produced by Upjohn.

Upjohn developed a process for the large scale production of cortisone. The oxygen atom group must be in position 11 for this steroid to function. There are, however, no known natural starting materials with an oxo-group in position 11. The only method for preparing cortisone prior to 1952 was a lengthy synthesis, starting from cholic acid isolated from bile. In 1952, two Upjohn biochemists, Dury Peterson and Herb Murray, announced that they had invented a new method by fermenting the steroid progesterone with a common mold of the genus Rhizopus. Over the next several years, a group of chemists headed by John Hogg developed a process for preparing cortisone from the soybean sterol stigmasterol. The microbiological oxygenation invented by Peterson and Murry is a key step in this process.

Subsequently, Upjohn (together with Pharmacia) biochemically converted cortisone into the more potent steroid prednisone via bacterial fermentation. In chemical research, the company is known for the development of the Upjohn dihydroxylation by V. VanRheenen, R. C. Kelly, and D. Y. Cha in 1976. Upjohn's best known drugs before its acquisition by Pfizer were Xanax, Halcion, Motrin, Lincocin, and Rogaine.

In 1995, Upjohn merged with Pharmacia AB to form Pharmacia & Upjohn. The company was owned by Pfizer from 2002 until 2020.

In 2015, Pfizer resurrected the Upjohn brand name for a division which manufactures and licenses drugs with patents that have expired. As of 2019, Pfizer planned to divest itself of this business in 2020.

In July 2019, Pfizer announced plans to merge Upjohn with Mylan. The merger was expected to close in the first half of 2020, was delayed due to the COVID-19 pandemic, and finally completed in November 2020. The resultant entity was named Viatris.

== See also ==
- W. E. Upjohn Institute for Employment Research
- Upjohn Co. v. United States (449 U.S. 383) (1981)
