= Pharmacia & Upjohn =

Global pharmaceutical company

- Type: Public
- Traded as: XSTO: PUP NYSE: PUP
- Industry: Pharmaceutical
- Founded: Merger of Pharmacia AB & The Upjohn Company
- Fate: Acquired by Pfizer

Pharmacia & Upjohn was a global pharmaceutical company formed by the merger of Sweden-based Pharmacia AB and the American company Upjohn in 1995. Today the remainder of the company is owned by Pfizer. In 1997, Pharmacia & Upjohn sold several brands to Johnson & Johnson, including Motrin and Cortaid.

== History ==
=== Amersham ===
In 1997, the biotechnology division of the company Pharmacia Biotech merged with Amersham Life Science with the new merged entity being known as Amersham Pharmacia Biotech. In 2001, the company was renamed Amersham Biotech. In 2002, Pharmacia sold its share of the company to Amersham plc. In 2004, Amersham Biosciences was acquired by GE Healthcare.

In 1998, the nutrition division of the company was sold to Fresenius.

=== Monsanto ===
Monsanto acquired the pharmaceutical company G. D. Searle & Company in 1985. In 1998, Searle and the Monsanto Pharma Sector partnered with Pfizer to develop and promote celecoxib, an anti-inflammatory drug used to treat arthritis. Branded as Celebrex, celecoxib was approved by the FDA in 1998. In December 1999, Pharmacia & Upjohn merged with the American biotechnology and medical company, Monsanto and renamed itself Pharmacia. The company retained Monsanto's pharmaceutical division - then known as Searle - and spun off the remaining interests as the "new Monsanto". The newly merged pharmaceutical entity changed its name to Pharmacia Corp.

=== Pfizer ===
In July 2002, Pharmacia Corp. and Pfizer announced an agreement that Pfizer would purchase Pharmacia; control of celecoxib was often mentioned as a key reason for Pfizer's acquisition of Pharmacia. The deal was finalized in April 2003.

=== Later developments ===
- The remnant of the Stockholm-based part of Pharmacia was partly spun off to Biovitrum in 2001, which sold off its plasma products division to Octapharma in 2002.
- In 2004, the allergy-diagnostic division of Pharmacia was sold off as Pharmacia Diagnostics. Later in 2004, the Uppsala-based ophthalmology division was sold to Advanced Medical Optics.
- In April 2006, Pharmacia Diagnostics changed its name to Phadia, which ended the use of the Pharmacia trademark. In September, Phadia was acquired by PPM Capital. In April 2006, Indian company Kemwell acquired Pfizer's Uppsala manufacturing plant that used to be under Pharmacia. The company's facilities in Strängnäs Sweden are currently being expanded for the production of Genotropin, a growth hormone.

=== Overview ===
The following is an illustration of the company's mergers, acquisitions, spin-offs and historical predecessors:

- Pharmacia Corp. Acquired by Pfizer, 2002
  - Pharmacia & Upjohn
    - Pharmacia (Merged 1995)
      - Kabi Pharmacia
        - Pharmacia Biotech
          - LKB-produkter AB
            (Acq 1968)
          - PL Laboratories
        - Kabi Vitrum
          (Acq 1990)
      - Farmitalia
        (Acq 1993)
    - Upjohn
      (Merged 1995)
  - Monsanto
    - Monsanto
    - G. D. Searle & Company
      (Acq 1985)
