= TransMolecular =

American biotechnology company

TransMolecular, Inc.
- Industry: Biotech
- Headquarters: Birmingham, Alabama
- Parent: Morphotek, Inc. (from 2011)
- Website: transmolecular.com

TransMolecular was a biotech company located in Birmingham, Alabama. It was geared to finding anti-cancer targeted drugs.

TransMolecular, Inc. engaged in discovering, developing, and commercializing therapies for glioma, metastatic brain tumors, and cancers. It developed TM601, a synthetically-produced polypeptide that was derived from scorpion venom, which is used to specifically target tumors in the treatment of cancer. The company was founded in 1996. In 2003, Fortune Magazine listed the company as one of the 14 "most exciting, innovative companies in the nation".

In March 2011, TransMolecular's assets were purchased by Morphotek, a subsidiary of the Japanese pharmaceutical company Eisai.
