= Jerker Porath =

Swedish biochemist (1921–2016)

Jerker Porath (23 October 1921 – 21 January 2016) was a Swedish biochemist who invented several separation methods for biomolecules. He was born in Sala.

Porath studied at Uppsala University and initially did research in organic chemistry under Arne Fredga, where he got his licentiate degree. After a scholarship to an institute in Heidelberg he got an interest in biochemistry and switched to Arne Tiselius' department. Tiselius recommended Porath to make a research visit to Choh Hao Li and his Hormone Research Laboratory at University of California, Berkeley where Porath stayed 1951–1952. Back in Uppsala he developed methods for zone electrophoresis and ion exchange chromatography for hormone purification. He received his Ph.D. in Uppsala 1957 with the thesis Zone electrophoresis in columns and adsorption chromatography on ionic cellulose derivatives as methods for peptide and protein fractionations: application to the study of posterior pituitary hormones.

The separation method for which Porath is most well known is gel filtration, which he developed together with Per Flodin. Flodin worked with dextran research at Pharmacia. In 1957, Porath discovered that columns filled with dextran gel could be used as "molecular sieves" to separate biomolecules by size. After patenting had been initiated, Porath and Flodin published their discoveries in Nature on 13 June 1959. A short time thereafter, Pharmacia offered the product Sephadex (Separation Pharmacia Dextran) on the market.

Porath also worked on affinity chromatography and was later appointed professor of biochemistry at Uppsala University.

In 1971 he was elected a member of the Royal Swedish Academy of Engineering Sciences and a few years later a member of the Royal Swedish Academy of Sciences. He died in Lund in 2016 at the age of 94.
