= Sephadex =

Cross-linked dextran gel used for gel filtration

Sephadex is a cross-linked dextran gel used for gel filtration. It was launched by Pharmacia in 1959, after development work by Jerker Porath and Per Flodin. The name is derived from separation Pharmacia dextran. It is normally manufactured in a bead form and most commonly used for gel filtration columns. By varying the degree of cross-linking, the fractionation properties of the gel can be altered.

These highly specialized gel filtration and chromatographic media are composed of macroscopic beads synthetically derived from the polysaccharide dextran. The organic chains are cross-linked to give a three-dimensional network having functional ionic groups attached by ether linkages to glucose units of the polysaccharide chains.

Available forms include anion and cation exchangers, as well as gel filtration resins, with varying degrees of porosity; bead sizes fall in discrete ranges between 20 and 300 μm.

Sephadex is also used for ion-exchange chromatography.

Sephadex is crosslinked with epichlorohydrin.

== Applications ==
Sephadex is used to separate molecules by molecular weight. Sephadex is a faster alternative to dialysis (de-salting), requiring a low dilution factor (as little as 1.4:1), with high activity recoveries. Sephadex is also used for buffer exchange and the removal of small molecules during the preparation of large biomolecules, such as ampholytes, detergents, radioactive or fluorescent labels, and phenol (during DNA purification).

A special hydroxypropylated form of Sephadex resin, named Sephadex LH-20, is used for the separation and purification of small organic molecules such as steroids, terpenoids, lipids. An example of use is the purification of cholesterol.

== Fractionation ==
Exclusion chromatography.

Fractionation Range of Globular Proteins and Dextrans (Da).

Gel Type	Fractionation Range	
Gel Type	Globular Proteins	Dextrans
G-10	≤700	≤700
G-15	≤1500	≤1500
G-25	1000–5000	100–5,000
G-50	1500–30,000	500–10,000
G-75	3000–80,000	1000–50,000
G-75 SF	3000–70,000	1000–50,000
G-100	4000–150,000	1000–100,000
G-100 SF	4000–100,000	1000–100,000
G-150	5000–300,000	1000–150,000
G-150 SF	5000–150,000	1000–150,000
G-200	5000–600,000	1000–200,000
G-200 SF	5000–250,000	1000–200,000

Ion-exchange chromatography.

Description	Functionality	Bead size (μ)
Sephadex-CM C-25	carboxymethyl	40-120
Sephadex-CM C-50	carboxymethyl	40-120
Sephadex-DEAE A-25	2-(diethylamino)ethyl	40-120
Sephadex-DEAE A-50	2-(diethylamino)ethyl	40-120
Sephadex-QAE A-25	quaternary aminoethyl	40-120
Sephadex-QAE A-50	quaternary aminoethyl	40-120
Sephadex-SP C-25	sulfopropyl	40-120
Sephadex-SP C-50	sulfopropyl	40-120

Sephadex ion exchangers are produced by introducing functional groups onto the cross-linked dextran matrix. These groups are attached to glucose units in the matrix by stable ether linkages.

== See also ==
- PEGylation
- Size exclusion chromatography
- Superose
- Sepharose
