= Sulfalene =

Chemical used to treat pulmonary issues

Clinical data
- Trade names: Eadazine, Kelfizina, Kelfizine W, Longum
- Other names: Sulfametopyrazine
- AHFS/Drugs.com: International Drug Names
- Routes of administration: Oral
- ATC code: J01ED02 (WHO) QJ01EQ19 (WHO)

Pharmacokinetic data
- Protein binding: 60 to 80%
- Elimination half-life: 60 to 65 hours
- Excretion: Urinary

Identifiers
- IUPAC name: 4-Amino-N-(3-methoxypyrazinyl)benzenesulfonamide
- CAS Number: 152-47-6
- PubChem CID: 9047
- DrugBank: DB00664
- ChemSpider: 8695
- UNII: T6BL4ZC15G
- KEGG: D01216
- CompTox Dashboard (EPA): DTXSID2046179
- ECHA InfoCard: 100.005.278

Chemical and physical data
- Formula: C_{11}H_{12}N_{4}O_{3}S
- Molar mass: 280.30 g·mol^{−1}
- 3D model (JSmol): Interactive image
- SMILES: O=S(=O)(Nc1nccnc1OC)c2ccc(N)cc2
- InChI: InChI=1S/C11H12N4O3S/c1-18-11-10(13-6-7-14-11)15-19(16,17)9-4-2-8(12)3-5-9/h2-7H,12H2,1H3,(H,13,15); Key:KXRZBTAEDBELFD-UHFFFAOYSA-N

Sulfalene (INN, USAN) or sulfametopyrazine (BAN) is a long-acting sulfonamide antibacterial used for the treatment of chronic bronchitis, urinary tract infections and malaria. As of 2014 there were only two countries in which it is currently still marketed: Thailand and Ireland.

It was discovered by researchers at Farmitalia and first published in 1960 and was marketed as Kelfizina.

== See also ==
- Sulfadoxine
