= Amersham plc =

Former British radiopharmaceutical manufacturer

- Formerly: The Radiochemical Centre at Amersham; The Radiochemical Centre Ltd; Amersham International plc
- Type: Private
- Traded as: LSE: AMSM (no longer traded)
- Industry: Health care
- Founded: 1946; 80 years ago
- Defunct: 2003; 23 years ago
- Fate: Acquired by GE Healthcare
- Headquarters: Amersham, Little Chalfont Buckinghamshire, United Kingdom
- Parent: GE HealthCare
- Website: www.amersham.com

Amersham plc was a manufacturer of radiopharmaceutical products, to be used in diagnostic and therapeutic nuclear medicine procedures. The company became GE Healthcare following a takeover in 2003, which was based at the original site in Amersham, Buckinghamshire until 2016, when the headquarters moved to Chicago.

== History ==
Chilcote House in Little Chalfont near Amersham was first used for extraction of radium from radium concentrates in 1940, under Walter Patrick Grove. Over the next four years over 500 kilograms of radium bromide was produced, to be used to make luminous dials and instruments. In 1946 the facility was taken over by the Ministry of Supply and it became known as the "national centre for the processing and distribution of radium, radon and artificial radioactive substances for scientific, medical and industrial purposes". With a new focus on healthcare and industrial applications, the site was expanded, and by 1949 when the name changed to "The Radiochemical Centre (TRC), Amersham", the production included radium gas capsules for cancer treatment and carbon-14. The following year it became an outstation of the Atomic Energy Research Establishment (UKAERA) at Harwell, processing materials produced in its reactors.

By the 1960s, TRC had over 1,000 catalogue items, using over 100 isotopes and exporting to 60 countries. A cyclotron was installed, the first for medical isotope production. With the restructuring of the UKAERA in 1971, TRC became a limited company. By this time TRC had several international subsidiaries; for example, Amersham Buchler GmbH & Co. KG was a joint venture with Buchler GmbH of Braunschweig in West Germany. In 1976 work began on a second production site in Cardiff.

The Radiochemical Centre Limited became Amersham International Limited in 1981 and was the first company to be privatised by the Thatcher Government in 1982 under the new name Amersham International plc. It was the first privatisation in which the government sold 100% of its shares in a company. The offer was 24.6 times subscribed, meaning the share price rose from 142p per share to 188p per share by closing on the first day. The government retained a special share, allowing the veto of any outsourcing attempts, until it was redeemed in 1988.

In the early 1990s, the in-vitro diagnostic assay business was divested to a joint venture with Eastman Kodak called Amerlite Diagnostics Ltd, this was later wholly acquired by Eastman Kodak and renamed Kodak Clinical Diagnostics Ltd. This business was sold by Kodak to Johnson & Johnson and became known as Johnson & Johnson Clinical Diagnostics Ltd. The business is now called Ortho-Clinical Diagnostics Ltd.

In 1997 Pharmacia Biotech (Sweden), then owned by Pharmacia & Upjohn, was fused with Amersham Life Science and renamed Amersham Pharmacia Biotech. The Pharmacia name of this subsidiary was later dropped when Pharmacia & Upjohn sold its share of the company to Amersham plc, and changed its name to Amersham Biosciences in 2001.

In 1997, Amersham merged with Nycomed (Norway) to form Nycomed Amersham plc. In 1999, the Nycomed Pharma subsidiary was sold to Nordic Capital, and in 2001 Nycomed Amersham plc was renamed to Amersham plc.

In 2004, Amersham was acquired by the American firm General Electric (GE) and incorporated into the GE Healthcare business segment.

In 2005 the Royal Society of Chemistry named the former Amersham Laboratories, known as the Grove Centre under GE, as an historic chemical landmark for its "achievements in the fields of industrial and medical applications" over the past six decades.

== Operations ==
GE Healthcare has a UK office in Chalfont St. Giles, near Amersham.

In 2018 part of the company's 30-acre (12 ha) Cardiff site was sold for redevelopment as operations consolidated into a smaller area.

Amersham's former business segments became GE Healthcare Medical Diagnostics and GE Healthcare Life Sciences. In 2020 GE Healthcare Life Sciences was acquired by Danaher Corporation and renamed Cytiva.

== See also ==
- Pharmaceutical industry in the United Kingdom
