= Farmitalia =

- Industry: Pharmaceutical
- Founded: 1935

Farmitalia was an Italian pharmaceutical company best known for its parallel discovery with Rhone-Poulenc of daunorubicin and subsequent discovery of doxorubicin. Farmitalia had been founded in 1935 as a joint venture by Rhone-Poulenc and Montecatini. Farmitalia occupied a position of choice in the world rankings of the profession, not only in Italy, but also at the world level with in particular the patent of Adriamycin, an anti-cancer drug qualified. From its creation, Farmaceutici Italia buys the Schiapparelli factory.

In 1978, Farmitalia was merged with Carlo Erba SpA, an Italian pharmaceutical company that had been founded in 1853 by the pharmacist Carlo Erba, in which Montecatini had acquired a controlling interest in 1971. The merged company was called Farmitalia Carlo Erba SpA.

Farmitalia Carlo Erba was acquired by Pharmacia in 1993, then Pharmacia was acquired by Pfizer in 2003.

Drugs discovered at Farmitalia that reached the market included (with date of first publication):

- 1960 Sulfalene
- 1963 Daunorubicin
- 1969 Doxorubicin
- 1980 Cabergoline
- 1984 Reboxetine
