= Fast protein liquid chromatography =

Chromotography used to analyze proteins

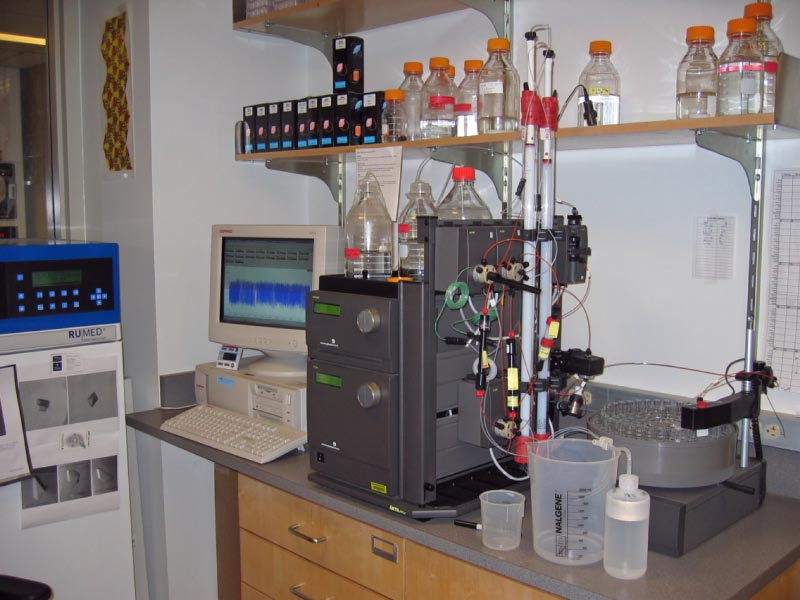
- A standard FPLC instrument
- Acronym: FPLC
- Classification: Chromatography
- Manufacturers: NGC System (Bio-Rad Laboratories), Arista (Practichem), ÄKTA (Cytiva), Contichrom (ChromaCon), BioSMB (Pall Life Sciences)

Other techniques
- Related: High performance liquid chromatography Affinity chromatography Size exclusion chromatography

Fast protein liquid chromatography (FPLC) is a form of liquid chromatography that is often used to analyze or purify mixtures of proteins. As in other forms of chromatography, separation is possible because the different components of a mixture have different affinities for two materials, a moving fluid (the mobile phase) and a porous solid (the stationary phase). In FPLC the mobile phase is an aqueous buffer solution. The buffer flow rate is controlled by a positive-displacement pump and is normally kept constant, while the composition of the buffer can be varied by drawing fluids in different proportions from two or more external reservoirs. The stationary phase is a resin composed of beads, usually of cross-linked agarose, packed into a cylindrical glass or plastic column. FPLC resins are available in a wide range of bead sizes and surface ligands depending on the application.

FPLC was developed and marketed in Sweden by Pharmacia in 1982, and was originally called fast performance liquid chromatography to contrast it with high-performance liquid chromatography (HPLC). FPLC is generally applied only to proteins; however, because of the wide choice of resins and buffers it has broad applications. In contrast to HPLC, the buffer pressure used is relatively low, typically less than 5 bar, but the flow rate is relatively high, typically 1–5 ml/min.

FPLC can be readily scaled from analysis of milligrams of mixtures in columns with a total volume of 5 ml or less to industrial production of kilograms of purified protein in columns with volumes of many liters. When used for analysis of mixtures, the eluant is usually collected in fractions of 1–5 ml which can be further analyzed. When used for protein purification there may be only two collection containers: one for the purified product and one for waste.

== General principles ==
In a common FPLC strategy, a resin is chosen that the protein of interest will bind to by a charge interaction while in buffer A (the running buffer) but become dissociated and return to solution in buffer B (the elution buffer). A mixture containing one or more proteins of interest is dissolved in 100% buffer A and pumped into the column. The proteins of interest bind to the resin while other components are carried out in the buffer. The total flow rate of the buffer is kept constant; however, the proportion of buffer B (the "elution" buffer) is gradually increased from 0% to 100% according to a programmed change in concentration (the "gradient"). At some point during this process each of the bound proteins dissociates and appears in the eluant. The eluant passes through two detectors which measure salt concentration (by conductivity) and protein concentration (by absorption of ultraviolet light at a wavelength of 280 nm). As each protein is eluted, it appears in the eluant as a "peak" in protein concentration, and can be collected for further use.

== System components ==
A typical laboratory FPLC consist of one or two high-precision pumps, a control unit, a column, a detection system and a fraction collector. Although it is possible to operate the system manually, the components are normally linked to a personal computer or, in older units, a microcontroller.

=== Pumps ===
The majority of systems utilize two two-cylinder piston pumps, one for each buffer, combining the output of both in a mixing chamber. Some simpler systems use a single peristaltic pump which draws both buffers from separate reservoirs through a proportioning valve and mixing chamber. In either case the system allows the fraction of each buffer entering the column to be continuously varied. The flow rate can go from a few milliliters per minute in bench-top systems to liters per minute for industrial scale purifications. The wide flow range makes it suitable both for analytical and preparative chromatography.

=== Injection loop ===
The injection loop is a segment of tubing of known volume which is filled with the sample solution before it is injected into the column. Loop volume can range from a few microliters to 50 ml or more.

=== Injection valve ===
The injection valve is a motorized valve which links the mixer and sample loop to the column. Typically the valve has three positions for loading the sample loop, for injecting the sample from the loop into the column, and for connecting the pumps directly to the waste line to wash them or change buffer solutions. The injection valve has a sample loading port through which the sample can be loaded into the injection loop, usually from a hypodermic syringe using a Luer-lock connection.

=== Column ===
The column is a glass or plastic cylinder packed with beads of resin and filled with buffer solution. It is normally mounted vertically with the buffer flowing downward from top to bottom. A glass frit at the bottom of the column retains the resin beads in the column while allowing the buffer and dissolved proteins to exit.

=== Flow cell ===
The eluant from the column passes through one or more flow cells to measure the concentration of protein in the eluant (by UV light absorption at 280 nm). The conductivity cell measures the buffer conductivity, usually in millisiemens/cm, which indicates the concentration of salt in the buffer. A flow cell which measures pH of the buffer is also commonly included. Usually each flow cell is connected to a separate electronics module which provides power and amplifies the signal.

=== Monitor/recorder ===
The flow cells are connected to a display and/or recorder. On older systems this was a simple chart recorder, on modern systems a computer with hardware interface and display is used. This permits the experimenter to identify when peaks in protein concentration occur, indicating that specific components of the mixture are being eluted.

=== Fraction collector ===
The fraction collector is typically a rotating rack that can be filled with test tubes or similar containers. Distribution of the eluate into separate containers are determined by fixed volumes or specific fractions detected at peaks of protein concentration.

Many systems include various optional components. A filter may be added between the mixer and column to minimize clogging. In large FPLC columns the sample may be loaded into the column directly using a small peristaltic pump rather than an injection loop. When the buffer contains dissolved gas, bubbles may form as pressure drops where the buffer exits the column; these bubbles create artifacts if they pass through the flow cells. This may be prevented by degassing the buffers, e.g. with a degasser, or by adding a flow restrictor downstream of the flow cells to maintain a pressure of 1-5 bar in the eluant line.

== Columns ==
The columns used in FPLC are large (inner diameters on the order of millimeters) tubes that contain small (micrometer-scale) particles or gel beads as the stationary phase. The chromatographic bed is composed of gel beads inside the column and the sample is introduced into the injector and carried into the column by the flowing solvent. As a result of different components adhering to or diffusing through the gel, the sample mixture gets separated.

Columns used with an FPLC can separate macromolecules based on size (size-exclusion chromatography), charge distribution (ion exchange), hydrophobicity, reverse-phase or biorecognition (as with affinity chromatography). For easy use, a wide range of pre-packed columns for techniques such as ion exchange, gel filtration (size exclusion), hydrophobic interaction, and affinity chromatography are available. FPLC differs from HPLC in that the columns used for FPLC can only be used up to maximum pressure of 3-4 MPa (435-580 psi). Thus, if the pressure of HPLC can be limited, each FPLC column may also be used in an HPLC machine.

== Optimizing protein purification ==
Combinations of chromatographic methods can be used to purify a target molecule. The purpose of purifying proteins with FPLC is to deliver quantities of the target at sufficient purity in a biologically active state to suit its further use. The quality of the end product varies depending the type and amount of starting material, efficiency of separation, and selectivity of the purification resin. The ultimate goal of a given purification protocol is to deliver the required yield and purity of the target molecule in the quickest, cheapest, and safest way for acceptable results. The range of purity required can be from that required for basic analysis (SDS-PAGE or ELISA, for example), with only bulk impurities removed, to pure enough for structural analysis (NMR or X-ray crystallography), approaching >99% target molecule. Purity required can also mean pure enough that the biological activity of the target is retained. These demands can be used to determine the amount of starting material required to reach the experimental goal. If the starting material is limited and full optimization of purification protocol cannot be performed, then a safe standard protocol that requires a minimum adjustment and optimization steps are expected. This may not be optimal with respect to experimental time, yield, and economy but it will achieve the experimental goal. On the other hand, if the starting material is enough to develop more complete protocol, the amount of work to reach the separation goal depends on the available sample information and target molecule properties. Limits to development of purification protocols many times depends on the source of the substance to be purified, whether from natural sources (harvested tissues or organisms, for example), recombinant sources (such as using prokaryotic or eukaryotic vectors in their respective expression systems), or totally synthetic sources.

No chromatographic techniques provide 100% yield of active material and overall yields depend on the number of steps in the purification protocol. By optimizing each step for the intended purpose and arranging them that minimizes inter step treatments, the number of steps will be minimized.

A typical multistep purification protocol starts with a preliminary capture step which often utilizes ion exchange chromatography (IEC). The media (stationary phase) resin consists of beads, which range in size from being large (good for fast flow rates and little to no sample clarification at the expense of resolution) to small (for best possible resolution with all other factors being equal). Short and wide column geometries are amenable to high flow rates also at the expense of resolution, typically because of lateral diffusion of sample on the column. For techniques such as size exclusion chromatography to be useful, very long, thin columns and minimal sample volumes (maximum 5% of column volume) are required. Hydrophobic interaction chromatography (HIC) can also be used for first and/ or intermediate steps. Selectivity in HIC is independent of running pH and descending salt gradients are used. For HIC, conditioning involves adding ammonium sulfate to the sample to match the buffer A concentration. If HIC is used before IEC, the ionic strength would have to be lowered to match that of buffer A for IEC step by dilution, dialysis or buffer exchange by gel filtration. This is why IEC is usually performed prior to HIC as the high salt elution conditions for IEC are ideal for binding to HIC resins in the next purification step. Polishing is used to achieve the final level of purification required and is commonly performed on a gel filtration column. An extra intermediate purification step can be added or optimization of the different steps is performed for improving purity. This extra step usually involves another round of IEC under completely different conditions.

Although this is an example of a common purification protocol for proteins, the buffer conditions, flow rates, and resins used to achieve final goals can be chosen to cover a broad range of target proteins. This flexibility is imperative for a functional purification system as all proteins behave differently and often deviate from predictions.
