= Agarose =

Heteropolysaccharide found in red algae

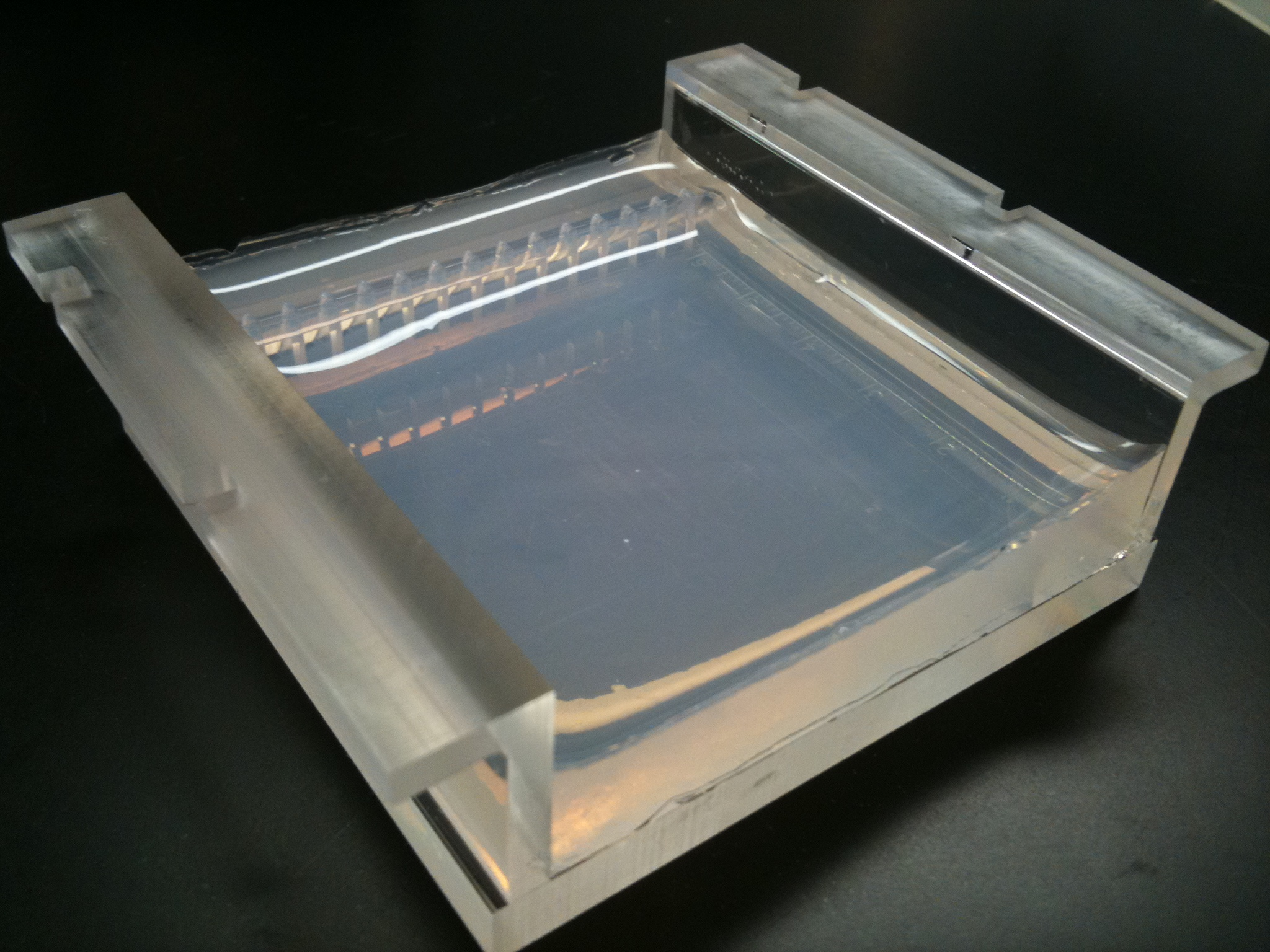
An agarose gel in a tray used for gel electrophoresis

Agarose is a polysaccharide, generally extracted from certain red algae. It is a linear polymer made up of the repeating unit of agarobiose, which is a disaccharide made up of D-galactose and 3,6-anhydro-L-galactopyranose. Agarose is one of the two principal components of agar, and is purified from agar by removing agar's other component, agaropectin.

Agarose is frequently used in molecular biology for the separation of large molecules, especially DNA, by electrophoresis. Slabs of agarose gels (usually 0.7 - 2%) for electrophoresis are readily prepared by pouring the warm, liquid solution into a mold. A variety of different agaroses of varying molecular weights and properties are commercially available for this purpose. Agarose may be formed into beads and used in a number of chromatographic methods for protein purification. It can also be used instead of agar as a solid medium for culturing cells and organisms.

== Structure ==
The structure of the repeating unit of an agarose polymer.

Agarose is a linear polymer with a molecular weight of about 120,000, consisting of alternating D-galactose and 3,6-anhydro-L-galactopyranose linked by α-(1→3) and β-(1→4) glycosidic bonds. The 3,6-anhydro-L-galactopyranose is an L-galactose with an anhydro bridge between the 3 and 6 positions, although some L-galactose units in the polymer may not contain the bridge. Some D-galactose and L-galactose units can be methylated, and pyruvate and sulfate are also found in small quantities.

Each agarose chain contains ~800 molecules of galactose, and the agarose polymer chains form helical fibers that aggregate into supercoiled structure with a radius of 20-30 nanometer (nm). The fibers are quasi-rigid, and have a wide range of length depending on the agarose concentration. When solidified, the fibers form a three-dimensional mesh of channels of diameter ranging from 50 nm to >200 nm depending on the concentration of agarose used - higher concentrations yield lower average pore diameters. The 3-D structure is held together with hydrogen bonds and can therefore be disrupted by heating back to a liquid state.

== Properties ==
Agarose is available as a white powder which dissolves in near-boiling water, and forms a gel when it cools. Agarose exhibits the phenomenon of thermal hysteresis in its liquid-to-gel transition, i.e. it gels and melts at different temperatures. The gelling and melting temperatures vary depending on the type of agarose. Standard agaroses derived from Gelidium has a gelling temperature of 34–38 °C (93–100 °F) and a melting temperature of 90–95 °C (194–203 °F), while those derived from Gracilaria, due to its higher methoxy substituents, has a gelling temperature of 40–52 °C (104–126 °F) and melting temperature of 85–90 °C (185–194 °F). The melting and gelling temperatures may be dependent on the concentration of the gel, particularly at low gel concentration of less than 1%. The gelling and melting temperatures are therefore given at a specified agarose concentration.

Natural agarose contains uncharged methyl groups and the extent of methylation is directly proportional to the gelling temperature. Synthetic methylation however have the reverse effect, whereby increased methylation lowers the gelling temperature. A variety of chemically modified agaroses with different melting and gelling temperatures are available through chemical modifications.

The agarose in the gel forms a meshwork that contains pores, and the size of the pores depends on the concentration of agarose added. On standing, the agarose gels are prone to syneresis (extrusion of water through the gel surface), but the process is slow enough to not interfere with the use of the gel.

Agarose gel can have high gel strength at low concentration, making it suitable as an anti-convection medium for gel electrophoresis. Agarose gels as dilute as 0.15% can form slabs for gel electrophoresis. The agarose polymer contains charged groups, in particular pyruvate and sulfate. These negatively charged groups can slow down the movement of DNA molecules in a process called electroendosmosis (EEO).

Low EEO (LE) agarose is therefore generally preferred for use in agarose gel electrophoresis of nucleic acids. Zero EEO agaroses are also available but these may be undesirable for some applications as they may be made by adding positively charged groups that can affect subsequent enzyme reactions. Electroendosmosis is a reason agarose is used preferentially over agar as agaropectin in agar contains a significant amount of negatively charged sulphate and carboxyl groups. The removal of agaropectin in agarose substantially reduces the EEO, as well as reducing the non-specific adsorption of biomolecules to the gel matrix. However, for some applications such as the electrophoresis of serum protein, a high EEO may be desirable, and agaropectin may be added in the gel used.

LE agarose is said to be better for preparative electrophoresis, i.e. when DNA needs to be extracted from an agarose gel.

=== Low melting and gelling temperature agaroses ===
The melting and gelling temperatures of agarose can be modified by chemical modifications, most commonly by hydroxyethylation, which reduces the number of intrastrand hydrogen bonds, resulting in lower melting and setting temperatures compared to standard agaroses. The exact temperature is determined by the degree of substitution, and many available low-melting-point (LMP) agaroses can remain fluid at 30–35 °C (86–95 °F) range. This property allows enzymatic manipulations to be carried out directly after the DNA gel electrophoresis by adding slices of melted gel containing DNA fragment of interest to a reaction mixture. The LMP agarose contains fewer of the sulphates that can affect some enzymatic reactions, and is therefore preferably used for some applications.

Hydroxyethylated agarose also has a smaller pore size (~90 nm) than standard agaroses. Hydroxyethylation may reduce the pore size by reducing the packing density of the agarose bundles, therefore LMP gel can also have an effect on the time and separation during electrophoresis. Ultra-low melting or gelling temperature agaroses may gel only at 8–15 °C (46–59 °F).

== Applications ==
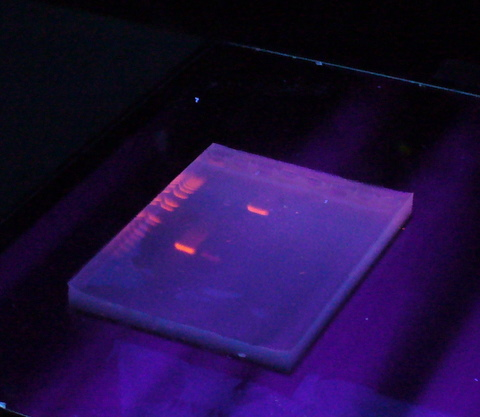
An agarose gel with bands of DNA stained with ethidium bromide and visualized under UV light on a UV Transilluminator.

Agarose is a preferred matrix for work with proteins and nucleic acids as it has a broad range of physical, chemical and thermal stability, and its lower degree of chemical complexity also makes it less likely to interact with biomolecules. Agarose is most commonly used as the medium for analytical scale electrophoretic separation in agarose gel electrophoresis. Gels made from purified agarose have a relatively large pore size, making them useful for separation of large molecules, such as proteins and protein complexes >200 kilodaltons, as well as DNA fragments >100 basepairs. Agarose is also used widely for a number of other applications, for example immunodiffusion and immunoelectrophoresis, as the agarose fibers can function as anchor for immunocomplexes.

=== Agarose gel electrophoresis ===
Agarose gel electrophoresis is the routine method for resolving DNA in the laboratory. Agarose gels have lower resolving power for DNA than acrylamide gels, but they have greater range of separation, and are therefore usually used for DNA fragments with lengths of 50–20,000 bp (base pairs), although resolution of over 6 Mb is possible with pulsed field gel electrophoresis (PFGE). It can also be used to separate large protein molecules, and it is the preferred matrix for the gel electrophoresis of particles with effective radii larger than 5-10 nm.

The pore size of the gel affects the size of the DNA that can be sieved. The lower the concentration of the gel, the larger the pore size, and the larger the DNA that can be sieved. However low-concentration gels (0.1 - 0.2%) are fragile and therefore hard to handle, and the electrophoresis of large DNA molecules can take several days. The limit of resolution for standard agarose gel electrophoresis is around 750 kb. This limit can be overcome by PFGE, where alternating orthogonal electric fields are applied to the gel. The DNA fragments reorientate themselves when the applied field switches direction, but larger molecules of DNA take longer to realign themselves when the electric field is altered, while for smaller ones it is quicker, and the DNA can therefore be fractionated according to size.

Agarose gels are cast in a mold, and when set, usually run horizontally submerged in a buffer solution. Tris-acetate-EDTA and Tris-Borate-EDTA buffers are commonly used, but other buffers such as Tris-phosphate, barbituric acid-sodium barbiturate or Tris-barbiturate buffers may be used in other applications. The DNA is normally visualized by staining with ethidium bromide and then viewed under a UV light, but other methods of staining are available, such as SYBR Green, GelRed, methylene blue, and crystal violet. If the separated DNA fragments are needed for further downstream experiment, they can be cut out from the gel in slices for further manipulation.

=== Protein purification ===
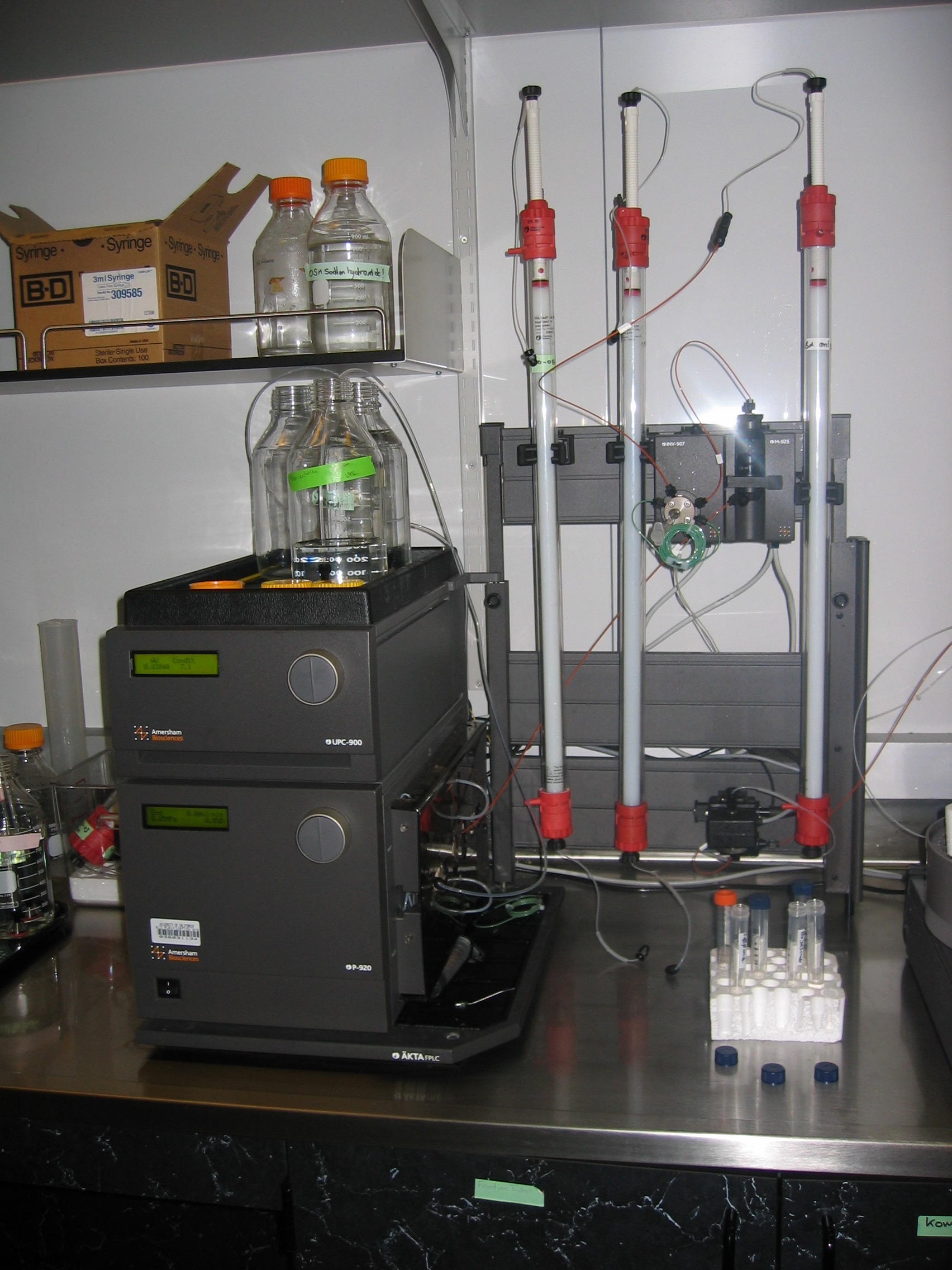
Agarose-based gel filtration columns used for protein purification on an AKTA FPLC machine.

Agarose gel matrix is often used for protein purification, for example, in column-based preparative scale separation as in gel filtration chromatography, affinity chromatography and ion exchange chromatography. It is however not used as a continuous gel, rather it is formed into porous beads or resins of varying fineness. The beads are highly porous so that protein may flow freely through the beads. These agarose-based beads are generally soft and easily crushed, so they should be used under gravity-flow, low-speed centrifugation, or low-pressure procedures. The strength of the resins can be improved by increased cross-linking and chemical hardening of the agarose resins, however such changes may also result in a lower binding capacity for protein in some separation procedures such as affinity chromatography.

Agarose is a useful material for chromatography because it does not absorb biomolecules to any significant extent, has good flow properties, and can tolerate extremes of pH and ionic strength as well as high concentration of denaturants such as 8M urea or 6M guanidine HCl. Examples of agarose-based matrix for gel filtration chromatography are Sepharose and WorkBeads 40 SEC (cross-linked beaded agarose), Praesto and Superose (highly cross-linked beaded agaroses), and Superdex (dextran covalently linked to agarose).

For affinity chromatography, beaded agarose is the most commonly used matrix resin for the attachment of the ligands that bind protein. The ligands are linked covalently through a spacer to activated hydroxyl groups of agarose bead polymer. Proteins of interest can then be selectively bound to the ligands to separate them from other proteins, after which it can be eluted. The agarose beads used are typically of 4% and 6% densities with a high binding capacity for protein.

=== Solid culture media ===
Agarose plate may sometimes be used instead of agar for culturing organisms as agar may contain impurities that can affect the growth of the organism or some downstream procedures such as polymerase chain reaction (PCR). Agarose is also harder than agar and may therefore be preferable where greater gel strength is necessary, and its lower gelling temperature may prevent causing thermal shock to the organism when the cells are suspended in liquid before gelling. It may be used for the culture of strict autotrophic bacteria, plant protoplast, Caenorhabditis elegans, other organisms and various cell lines.

=== Motility assays ===
Agarose is sometimes used instead of agar to measure microorganism motility and mobility. Motile species will be able to migrate, albeit slowly, throughout the porous gel and infiltration rates can then be visualized. The gel's porosity is directly related to the concentration of agar or agarose in the medium, so different concentration gels may be used to assess a cell's swimming, swarming, gliding and twitching motility. Under-agarose cell migration assay may be used to measure chemotaxis and chemokinesis. A layer of agarose gel is placed between a cell population and a chemoattractant. As a concentration gradient develops from the diffusion of the chemoattractant into the gel, various cell populations requiring different stimulation levels to migrate can then be visualized over time using microphotography as they tunnel upward through the gel against gravity along the gradient.

== See also ==
- Agar
- SDD-AGE
