= Pharmacia =

Pharmaceutical and biotechnological company

- Type: Aktiebolag
- Traded as: XSTO: PHAR
- Industry: Pharmaceutical
- Founded: 1911; 115 years ago
- Fate: Merged with Upjohn to form Pharmacia & Upjohn
- Headquarters: Sweden

Pharmacia was a pharmaceutical and biotechnological company in Sweden that merged with the American pharmaceutical company Upjohn in 1995.

== History ==
Pharmacia was founded in 1911 in Stockholm, Sweden by pharmacist Gustav Felix Grönfeldt at the Elgen Pharmacy. The company was named after the Greek word φαρμακεία, transliterated pharmakeia, which means 'sorcery'. In the company's early days, much of its profits were derived from the "miracle medicine" Phospho-Energon.

During World War II, Swedish chemist Björn Ingelman (who worked for Arne Tiselius at Uppsala university) researched various uses for the polysaccharide dextran. Together with the medical researcher Anders Grönwall, he discovered that dextran could be used as a replacement for blood plasma in blood transfusions, for which there could be a large need in wartime. Pharmacia, which then was still a small company, was contacted in 1943 and its CEO Elis Göth was very interested. The product Macrodex, a dextran solution, was launched four years later.

Dextran-based products were to play a significant role in the further expansion of Pharmacia. In 1951, the company moved to Uppsala, Sweden, to get closer to the scientists with whom they cooperated, and Ingelman became its head of research. In 1959, Pharmacia pioneered gel filtration with its Sephadex products. These were also based on dextran and discoveries in Tiselius' department, this time by Jerker Porath and Per Flodin. In 1967 Pharmacia Fine Chemicals was established in Uppsala. In 1986 Pharmacia Fine Chemicals acquired LKB-produkter AB and changed its name to Pharmacia Biotech. Pharmacia Biotech expanded their role in the "biotech revolution" through its acquisition of PL Laboratories from Pabst Brewery offering a line of recombinant DNA specialty research chemicals. Sold to private interests in the 1990s, Pharmacia was first merged with "Kabi Vitrum" to form Kabi Pharmacia with headquarters in Uppsala. In 1993, Kabi Pharmacia bought Farmitalia, an Italian company that had developed doxorubicin, a chemotherapeutic.

In 1995 the company merged with the American pharmaceutical company Upjohn, becoming known as Pharmacia & Upjohn and moved its headquarters to London.

In 1998, the company was divided into two business area. The pharmaceutical business became Pharmacia & Upjohn. The scientific instruments groups which sold chromatography resin, purification equipment, molecular biology reagents and electrophoresis products was purchased by Amersham in 1998 and was named Amersham Pharmacia Biotech. They later changed the name to Amersham Biosciences and ran their radiochemical and reagents business along with the highly profitable chromatography business. The Pharmacia Logo Drop remained as a highly recognized brand. Amersham Biosciences was sold to GE Healthcare in 2004 to become GE Healthcare Life Sciences. Since 1 April 2020, GE Healthcare Life Sciences has been named Cytiva, following the sale of GE Healthcare Life Sciences by General Electric to Danaher Corporation in a $21.4 billion acquisition.

=== Overview ===
The following is an illustration of the company's mergers, acquisitions, spin-offs and historical predecessors:

- Pharmacia (Merged with Upjohn, 1995)
  - Kabi Pharmacia
    - Pharmacia Biotech
      - LKB-produkter AB
        (Acq 1986)
      - PL Laboratories
    - Kabi Vitrum
      (Acq 1990)
  - Farmitalia
    (Acq 1993)
