= Richard Fuisz =

American physician, inventor, and entrepreneur

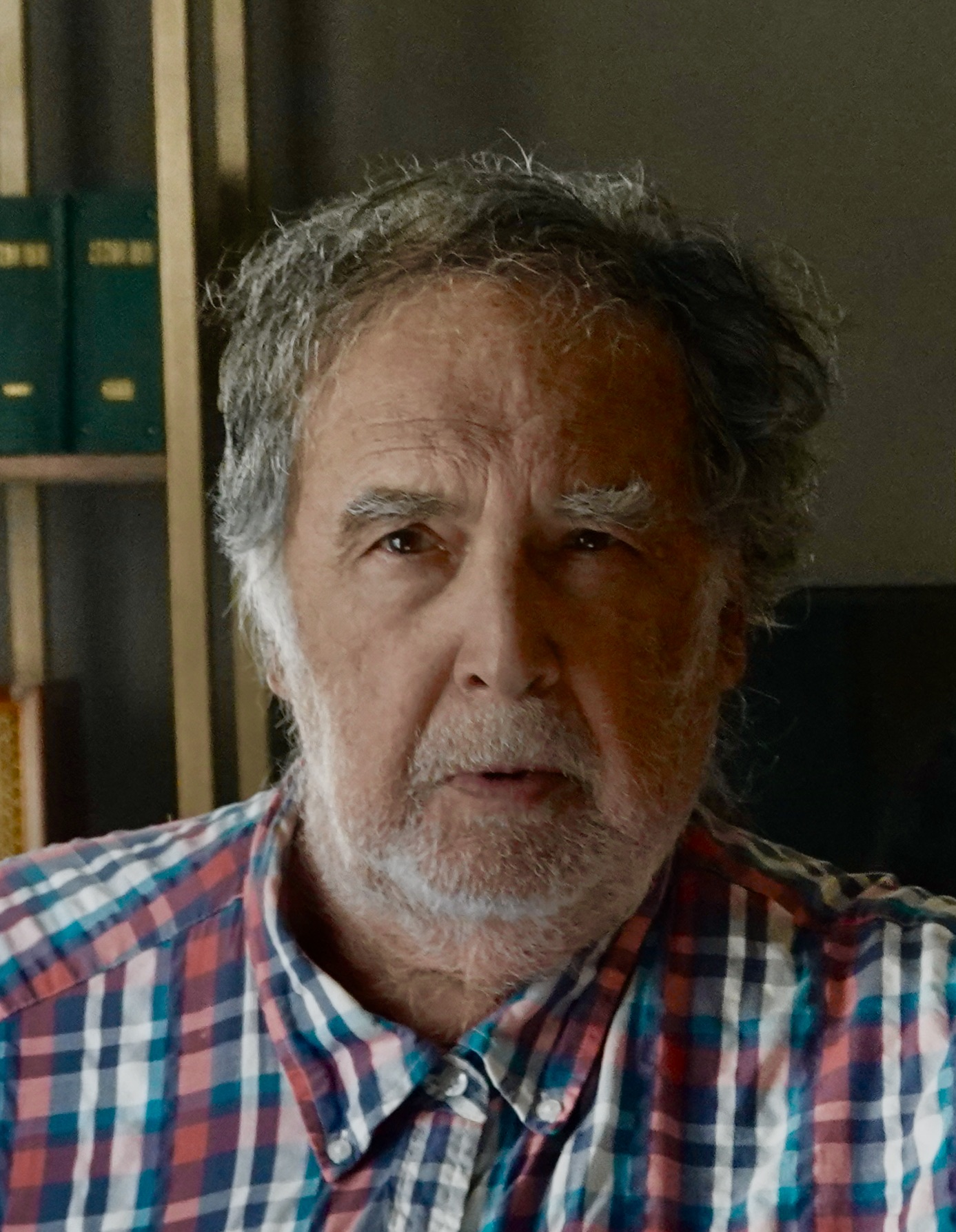
- Fuisz in August 2021
- Born: Richard Carl Fuisz; December 12, 1939 (age 86); Bethlehem, Pennsylvania, U.S.
- Education: Georgetown University (BS, MD)
- Children: 5, including Joseph

Richard Carl Fuisz (born December 12, 1939) is an American physician, inventor, and entrepreneur, with connections to the United States military and intelligence community. He holds more than two hundred patents worldwide, in such diverse fields as drug delivery, interactive media, and cryptography, and has lectured on these topics internationally. Fuisz is a member of the Board of Regents of Georgetown University, where he and his brother created an annual scholarship honoring their deceased elder sibling, and established the first endowed professorship at the Georgetown University School of Medicine.

== Early life and education ==
Fuisz was born on December 12, 1939, in Bethlehem, Pennsylvania, to Anton Fujs, a Slovenian immigrant from Murska Sobota and Margaret Matuš, a Slovenian-American whose parents had migrated from Prekmurje.

Fuisz and his older brother Robert graduated from Bethlehem Catholic High School before attending Georgetown University, where they both studied biology and eventually completed medical school. Fuisz completed his internship and residency at the Harvard Medical School's Cambridge Hospital campus.

== Career ==
After completing medical school and his residency, Fuisz served as a general physician and lieutenant commander in the U.S. Navy, where he was stationed at the White House during the Johnson administration. Fuisz and his family hold dual citizenship in the United States and Slovenia, and Fuisz endowed the Richard and Lorraine Fuisz Library and the Zoltan Fuisz Scholarship Fund at Moravian Academy for children of Slovenian ancestry.

=== Medcom ===
In the 1970s, Fuisz and his brother co-founded Medcom, Inc., a New York-based firm producing educational and training materials for health-care providers and consumers; Fuisz played the role of a physician in government-subsidized public health films. In 1971, Medcom acquired California-based Trainex Corporation, which supplied medical personnel training materials to the Middle East and North Africa. Fuisz learned Arabic so that he could better supervise Medcom's new division, and during this period Medcom became a top supplier of medical training to Middle Eastern militaries. Fuisz served as president and CEO of Medcom from 1975 until 1982, when the company was purchased by Baxter International, a supplier of hospital equipment, for $52 million. Fuisz initially offered to stay on for a three-year transition period to introduce the new ownership to his clients, but he was instead fired by Baxter chief executive Vernon Loucks.

After Medcom's sale and Fuisz's removal, business declined dramatically in the company's two biggest markets, the United States and Saudi Arabia, and profits plummeted. Then, in 1985 Fuisz sued Baxter over his termination.

When Fuisz arrived at the Baxter offices in Deerfield, Illinois, to sign the settlement and collect his financial compensation of $800,000, Baxter CEO Loucks refused to meet with him; Fuisz later said that he realized at that moment "there was only one way this would end." He claimed to have then spent $35,000 to obtain secret government documents describing Baxter's dealings with Syria, and he sent a 20-page memorandum to Baxter board members outlining his findings. He alleged that Baxter sold their Ashdod facility to Teva Pharmaceutical while simultaneously negotiating the construction of a similar plant in Syria, and that, for this reason, in 1989, they were removed from the Arab League's blacklist. With the help of the American Jewish Congress, he brought the anti-boycott charges to the United States Department of Commerce Office of Anti-Boycott Compliance (OAC). In 1991, OAC referred the case to the Justice Department, resulting in the first-ever criminal prosecution of a company for violating anti-boycott laws in the U.S. In 1993, though the prosecution was unable to prove Fuisz's allegations, Baxter pleaded guilty to illegal delivery of information about its Israeli business to Arab officials, which was prohibited under export control provisions of the EAA, and was assessed $6.5 million in fines and penalties.

=== Folkon ===
In the 1980s, Fuisz was involved in a number of business ventures in the Soviet Union through Leopoldina Import-Export Inc., an international business consulting firm, and Folkon, Ltd., an oil exploration company. Working with a young Mikhail Khodorkovsky, then the head of the Young Communist League, Fuisz exported computers and other electronics to the Soviet Union through the Center for Scientific and Technical Creativity of the Youth, and he would later claim that his business helped to supply computers to the KGB.

In 1988, Fuisz was approached by Yuri Dubinin, the Soviet ambassador to the United States, to set up a modeling agency that would prepare young Soviet models for American markets. The first model Fuisz was to oversee was Yulia Sukhanova, the first-ever Miss USSR, but hard-liners in the Moscow City Council obstructed Fuisz's efforts to secure Sukhanova's visa. With Khodorkovsky's assistance, he was able to smuggle Sukhanova out of the country, though upon reaching the U.S. she cut ties with Fuisz after a dispute over his commissions. In the first of two depositions regarding Fuisz's knowledge of the 1988 Lockerbie bombing, held in December 2000, Fuisz was prohibited from answering questions regarding the relationship between his Russian businesses and the Central Intelligence Agency – when asked if Folkon did any work for the CIA, whether it received any money from the CIA, or whether there were any links between the CIA and any of the companies operated by Fuisz, U.S. Attorney (DOJ) Anthony Coppolino raised objections precluding Fuisz's testimony on the grounds of state secrets privilege. In the second deposition, held in January 2001, when asked to describe his interactions with high-level Soviet officials, Fuisz claimed to have difficulty separating information gained in his capacity as director of the modeling agency from information gained in "his employment by the government", and that he was "prohibited by a contract with the government" from providing further clarification.

=== Allegations of arms sales to Iraq ===
In January 1992, The New York Times published an article by journalist Seymour Hersh alleging that U.S. intelligence had helped to arm the Iraqi military during the Gulf War, naming Fuisz as its primary source. The article described an affidavit Fuisz had submitted to the United States House Agriculture Subcommittee on Nutrition, Oversight, and Department Operations, which was investigating American heavy equipment manufacturer Terex Corp. Fuisz, who had been involved in business in the Middle East for many years, was representing a Saudi family interested in purchasing a heavy equipment company when he was given a tour of the Terex plant in Motherwell, Scotland in September 1987. During the tour, Fuisz noticed two large armor-plated vehicles painted in desert camouflage with specially attached steel backs; the plant manager allegedly told Fuisz that the vehicles were Scud missile launchers being manufactured for the Iraqi military, and that they were being smuggled by modifying their serial numbers to disguise them as civilian mining vehicles. When Fuisz questioned Terex Vice President David Langevin about the vehicles, he claims he was told that the shipments had been requested by the CIA, with the cooperation of British intelligence. Fuisz's allegations were corroborated by a former Terex employee also interviewed by the House Committee, who had been fired after raising questions about the company's bookkeeping.

Scud missiles were used extensively by Iraq during the Gulf War to strike coalition forces in Israel and Saudi Arabia. Fuisz claimed that he had attempted to bring Terex's arms deals to the attention of the United States House Energy Subcommittee on Oversight and Investigations in 1987, but committee chairman John Dingell had refused to act. Terex was (at the time) owned by General Motors (GM), a major political constituent in Dingell's home state of Michigan, and Dingell's wife was the granddaughter of a GM founder and a senior officer in the company's governmental relations department. Fuisz did not press the issue again until Charlie Rose of the Agriculture Committee asked him for an affidavit; the Scud launchers were suspected of being funded with ear-marked agriculture money through the Atlanta branch of the Italian Banca Nazionale del Lavoro (BNL) – documents obtained in a 1989 raid on the bank revealed that Terex, through its independent British distributor, had sold dump truck chassis in 1988 to the Iraqi "Technical Corps for Special Projects, Project 395," a code name for Saddam Hussein's missile program. Fuisz speculated that the Terex production was covered up out of fear of backlash from the patriotic demographic of American truck drivers, who drove vehicles manufactured almost exclusively by Fruehauf Corp., a wholly owned subsidiary of Terex.

Both Terex and the CIA immediately denied any military relationship with Iraq, and in April 1992, Terex filed a $15 million libel suit against Hersh and Fuisz, claiming that Fuisz fabricated the story as retaliation against the company for declining to enter into a business deal. In March 1993, the U.S. Department of Justice filed a Statement of Interest in the trial and invoked the state secrets privilege to bar Fuisz from testifying in his own defense. The gag order claimed that the information Fuisz possessed was vital to the "nation's security or diplomatic relations", and could not be revealed "no matter how compelling the need for, and relevance of, the information", while empowering the government to "protect its interests in this case in the future" (effectively gagging Fuisz permanently). In October 1994, the U.S. District Court for the District of Columbia upheld the Justice Department's claim of state secrets privilege and by 1996 the suit had been dismissed. In December 1995, The New York Times issued a retraction and apology for Hersh's 1992 article, claiming that "neither The Times nor Mr. Hersh intended" to give the impression that Terex was supplying Scud missile launchers to Iraq, blaming errors made in the editorial process and "false information" supplied by Fuisz. The retraction noted that a 16-month federal investigation had determined "there is no credible evidence" that Terex supplied military equipment to Iraq, affirming that "The Times has no evidence that contradicts the task force's findings"; this conclusion was supported by a separate investigation by the British House of Commons in 1996. However, in December 2003, a 12,000 page dossier submitted by the Scottish newspaper Sunday Herald to the United Nations revealed that Terex, along with more than twenty other American firms, had in fact supplied Iraq with weapons technology during the 1990s; Scottish Labour MP Tam Dalyell called the document "of huge significance" in exposing "the hypocrisy of Blair and Bush."

=== Fuisz Technologies Ltd. ===
In June 1988, Fuisz founded Chantilly, Virginia-based medical technology firm Fuisz Technologies Ltd. (FT). In December 1995 he took the company public – on the strength of Fuisz's patent for pills that would quickly dissolve in the mouth without water, the company had a successful initial public offering, and after its second offering in May 1996, its stock hit an all-time high of $31.50 per share. Fuisz secured an agreement with Johnson & Johnson to develop a rapid-dissolve version of Tylenol, and thanks to his patents on "taste making" technologies that gave drugs more desirable flavors, Fuisz negotiated deals with SmithKline, Beecham, and Bayer for development of new versions of their over-the-counter products, as well as with Astra, Pfizer, and Merck for modified versions of certain prescription drugs. FT also agreed to develop food products for British Sugar, ConAgra, General Mills, and Hershey Foods, among others. Despite these lucrative arrangements, aggressive short-sellers began spreading rumors that Fuisz was being imprisoned by the FBI while being investigated by the IRS, and that his pills were so fragile they would disintegrate in shipping; by early 1997, the company's stock had plummeted to $5.62. At around the same time, Fuisz resigned as CEO and hired Ken McVey, previously of Irish biotechnology firm Élan Corp., to replace him – though Fuisz retained 21% of the stock and his position as chairman of the company's board.

In January 1998, FT announced that it was selling its online drugstore to Richard Fuisz himself for $2.4 million, even though the business was worth only $50,000 on total sales of $60/month; Fuisz later claimed the purchase was a "white-knight act" performed in the interests of his shareholders. The next month, Fuisz Technologies sued Élan, accusing its rival of stealing trade secrets and of reneging on a prior manufacturing deal with FT. Fuisz also personally sued Élan for breach of contract – Fuisz had reached a hand-shake agreement to sell his 4.2 million shares in FT to Élan for about $70 million in Élan stock, which Élan refused to honor, but only after completing an audit through which they acquired confidential documents describing FT's proprietary technology and corporate strategy. News of the suit drove the company's share price from a high of $15.62 to $6.12, thanks to the significant shortfalls caused by Élan's refusal to manufacture FT products. In May, Fuisz threatened to fire McVey unless he resigned, blaming McVey's "bad management" for the company's struggles; McVey complied, Fuisz became acting CEO, and the stock fell again to $4. In April 1999, the lawsuit was settled; in addition to purchasing an unspecified number of shares in FT from Fuisz, Élan finally agreed to a licensing and manufacturing agreement in which they would produce 1.2 billion tablet doses/year of FT products at their facility in Athlone, Ireland. In July, Canadian drug firm Biovail purchased 49% of outstanding Fuisz Technologies common stock at $7/share, making FT a wholly owned subsidiary of Biovail. By September, McVey, then living in a hotel in the Channel Islands, had filed two complaints of securities fraud with the Securities and Exchange Commission: first, to investigate whether Fuisz had knowingly and wilfully stolen assets from FT through his purchase of the online drugstore, and second, to investigate Patrick Scrivens, the firm's chief financial officer and former CIA public accountant, who had sold all his FT stock at $15/share immediately before its big fall, and became CFO of the online drugstore upon his resignation.

=== Lockerbie bombing case ===
In 1998, Susan Lindauer submitted an affidavit to the United Nations claiming that she had met with 'a former intelligence operative,' naming Fuisz as her source, who disclosed that the Libyan government was wrongly accused of involvement in the 1988 Lockerbie bombing – she alleged that Fuisz had enlisted her help because he was being harassed by the IRS in retaliation for blowing the whistle on U.S. arms transfers to Iraq during the Gulf War. Although it was initially reported in various international media that a state secrets gag order barred Fuisz from speaking about Lindauer's statement, documents released in December 2013 by a member of Libyan Abdelbaset al-Megrahi's legal team show this to be only partially true. In May 2000, Megrahi's lawyer Eddie MacKechnie wrote to Department of Justice Lockerbie prosecutor Brian Murtagh to determine whether Fuisz was indeed barred from testifying; Murtagh replied that although Fuisz was still subject to a gag order related to the Terex libel suit, he was free to speak openly about the Pan Am bombing. Fuisz insisted that this was not true, that he was subject to a "statutory obligation of secrecy" independent of the Terex litigation, and that he had been specifically advised by Murtagh and another DOJ lawyer to remain silent about Lockerbie.

In September, MacKechnie asked Murtagh whether President Bill Clinton or CIA Director George Tenet could personally release Fuisz from his gag order; CIA general counsel Robert Eatinger replied with a letter to Murtagh reaffirming that no court order prohibited Fuisz's testimony. The next day, Fuisz called Eatinger's office seeking clarification of the letter – according to Eatinger, Fuisz described multiple briefings from CIA officers between 1988 and 1989 about various "security matters," in particular that Ahmed Jibril of the Popular Front for the Liberation of Palestine – General Command (PFLP-GC) was the primary suspect in the Lockerbie case; Eatinger responded that Fuisz was free to discuss the security briefings he received, but he was prohibited from revealing the identities of the CIA officers or discussing the purpose for which he received the briefings. Fuisz was deposed first in December 2000, in the presence of a DOJ lawyer and two unnamed CIA officials, and again in January 2001, with three anonymous CIA officials presiding – although U.S. Attorney Anthony Coppolino invoked the state secrets privilege whenever the line of questioning approached details of Fuisz's relationship to the CIA, Fuisz confirmed that he had received multiple briefings from CIA agents in 1989 in which they informed him, among other things, that the PFLP-GC was responsible for the bombings; he further claimed that between 1990 and 1995 he was told separately by 10–15 high level Syrian officials, who were in regular contact with Ahmed Jibril, that the Palestinian group was to blame, though he was prohibited from clarifying the nature of his relationship to these officials. In spite of Fuisz's testimony, Megrahi was sentenced to life imprisonment by the Scottish Court in the Netherlands in January 2001.

=== Susan Lindauer and September 11 attacks ===
After their initial introduction in 1994, Fuisz and Susan Lindauer continued to meet weekly to discuss her diplomatic contacts in the Middle East, including her work related to the lifting of U.S. sanctions against Libya and Iraq. In 2000, the Sunday Herald acquired the text of Lindauer's 1998 affidavit. Lindauer claimed that Fuisz had infiltrated a network of Syrian terrorists tied to Iranian Hezbollah who were holding Americans hostage in Beirut, and that he was "first on the ground" in the investigation of the Lockerbie bombing because of his extensive contacts in Syria, but the CIA was destroying his reports instead of submitting them to investigators. In May of that year, the Herald published an article alleging that Fuisz was the CIA Station Chief in Damascus during the 1980s; when asked to comment on the Herald's claim and on his relationship to the CIA more generally, Fuisz remarked that "This is not an issue I can confirm or deny. I am not allowed to speak about these issues. In fact, I can't even explain why I can't speak about these issues." Fuisz's meetings with Lindauer ended abruptly on September 11, 2001, the day of the September 11 attacks, due to what Fuisz described as an increasingly "seditious bent" to her discussions.

=== Kosmos Pharma and Fuisz LLC ===
In 2000, the same year he was named to the board of directors of Bradley Pharmaceuticals, Fuisz founded International Fluidics, another firm dedicated primarily to oral drug delivery systems; its name was changed to Kosmos Pharma in 2002. In order to acquire Fuisz's patents covering oral film strip technology, 'postage stamps' that dissolve instantly on the tongue, Kosmos was purchased by Monosol LLC in 2004, and Fuisz's son Joseph was named Monosol's senior Vice President. Meanwhile, Fuisz continued to develop and secure patents through his family-owned private company, Fuisz LLC; in addition to health care innovations such as vaginal drug delivery, thin-film-based smokeless tobacco and e-cigarettes, and systems for monitoring addictive drug compliance, Fuisz LLC also holds patents on wristwatches protected by encryption, computer vision (including face and object recognition) and e-commerce, among other diverse technological fields.

=== Theranos ===
In 2011, the blood testing company Theranos and its CEO Elizabeth Holmes sued Fuisz and his sons, alleging that Fuisz had misappropriated a Theranos patent and used that information to file his own medical analyzer patent. Theranos and Holmes were represented in the lawsuit by famed litigator David Boies. Boies alleged that the Fuiszes thought they could take advantage of Holmes because she was "young and female."

Theranos separately made the same claims against its law firm McDermott Will & Emery, in a case that was dismissed. Fuisz vociferously denied the allegations and defended himself pro se.

Fuisz was credited in the book Bad Blood with connecting the author John Carreyrou with the former medical director of Theranos, exposing Theranos's fraudulent blood testing system. John Carreyrou went on to write a series of articles for The Wall Street Journal, publicly revealing the Theranos fraud and intimidation tactics by Boies. In the 2022 Hulu miniseries The Dropout, Fuisz was portrayed by William H. Macy.
