= Takeda Pharmaceutical Company =

Japanese pharmaceutical company

Takeda Pharmaceutical Company Limited
- Logo used since 1961

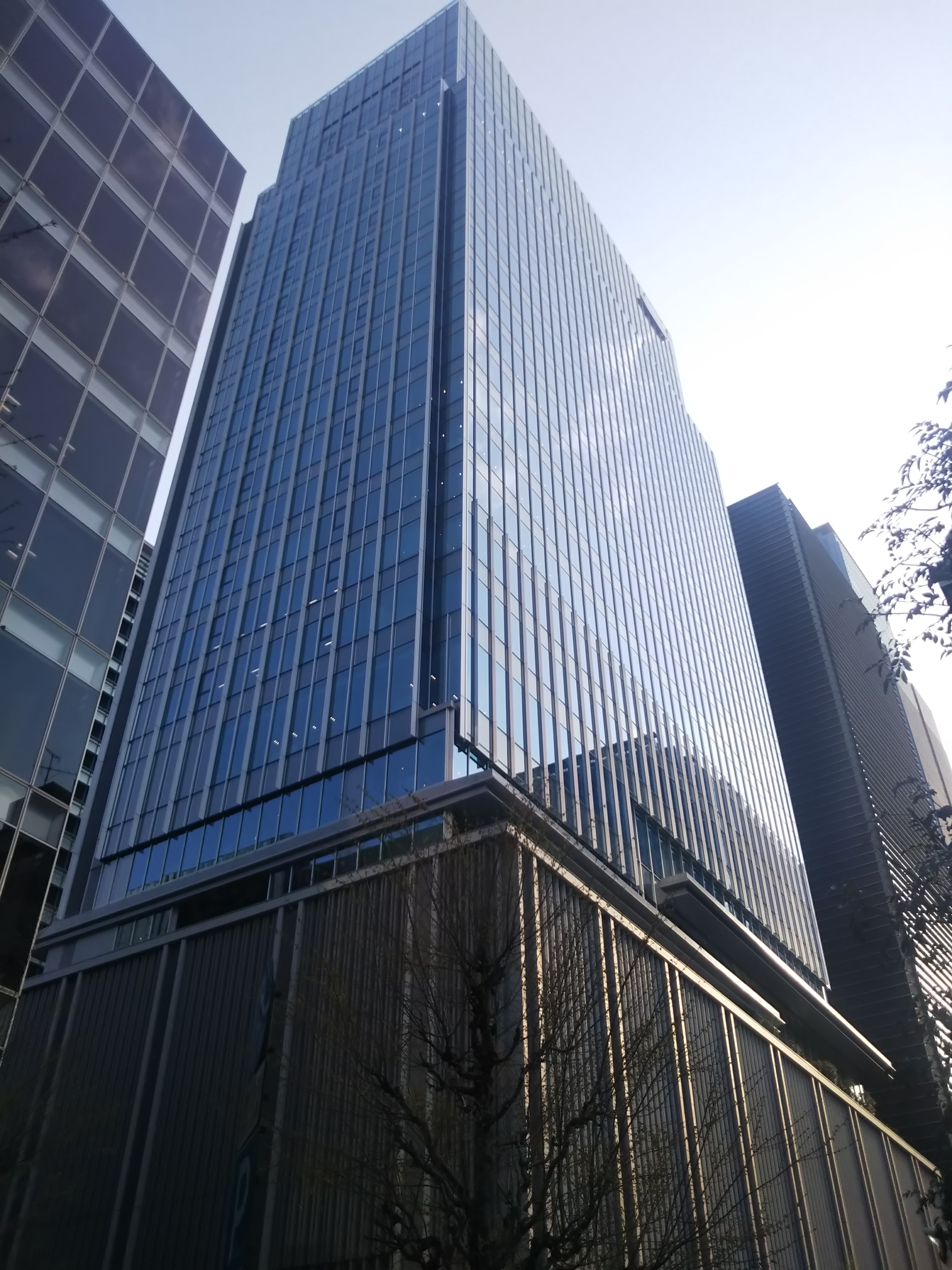
- Global headquarters in Nihonbashi
- Native name: 武田薬品工業株式会社
- Romanized name: Takeda Yakuhin Kōgyō kabushiki gaisha
- Formerly: Chobei Takeda & Co., Ltd. (1925–1943); Takeda Pharmaceutical Industries, Ltd. (English name only 1943–1961); Takeda Chemical Industries, Ltd. (English name only 1961–2004)
- Type: Public KK
- Traded as: TYO: 4502; NAG: 4502; FSE: 4502; NYSE: TAK; TOPIX Core30 component (TYO); Nikkei 225 component (TYO)
- Industry: Pharmaceuticals
- Founded: 12 June 1781; 245 years ago (as Omiya); 29 January 1925; 101 years ago (company)
- Founder: Chobei Takeda I
- Headquarters: Nihonbashi, Chuo, Tokyo, Japan
- Key people: Yasuchika Hasegawa (Chairman of the Board); Christophe Weber; Julie Kim (President & CEO)
- Revenue: ▲¥4.03 trillion (FY 2022)
- Operating income: ▲¥490.51 billion (FY 2022)
- Net income: ▲¥317.02 billion (FY 2022)
- Total assets: ▲¥13.96 trillion (FY 2022)
- Total equity: ▲¥6.35 trillion (FY 2022)
- Owners: BNY Mellon (5.39%); JPMorgan Chase (3.50%); Nippon Life (2.24%); State Street Corporation (1.50%)
- Number of employees: 49,578 (2019); 18,378 in United States; 5,350 in Japan
- Website: www.takeda.com

The Takeda Pharmaceutical Company Limited (武田薬品工業株式会社, Takeda Yakuhin Kōgyō kabushiki gaisha) [takeꜜda jakɯçiŋ koꜜːɡʲoː] is a Japanese multinational pharmaceutical company. It is the largest pharmaceutical company in Japan, third largest such company in Asia behind Sinopharm and Shanghai Pharmaceuticals, and one of the top 20 largest pharmaceutical companies in the world by revenue (top 10 following its merger with Shire). The company has over 49,578 employees worldwide and achieved US$19.299 billion in revenue during the 2018 fiscal year. The company is focused on oncology, rare diseases, neuroscience, gastroenterology, plasma-derived therapies and vaccines. Its headquarters is located in Chuo-ku, Osaka, and it has an office in Nihonbashi, Chuo, Tokyo. In January 2012, Fortune Magazine ranked the Takeda Oncology Company as one of the 100 best companies to work for in the United States. As of 2015, Christophe Weber was appointed as the CEO and president of Takeda. In 2026, Julie Kim was noted in a news item as "CEO-elect".

== History ==
=== Founding and initial acquisitions (1781–2010) ===
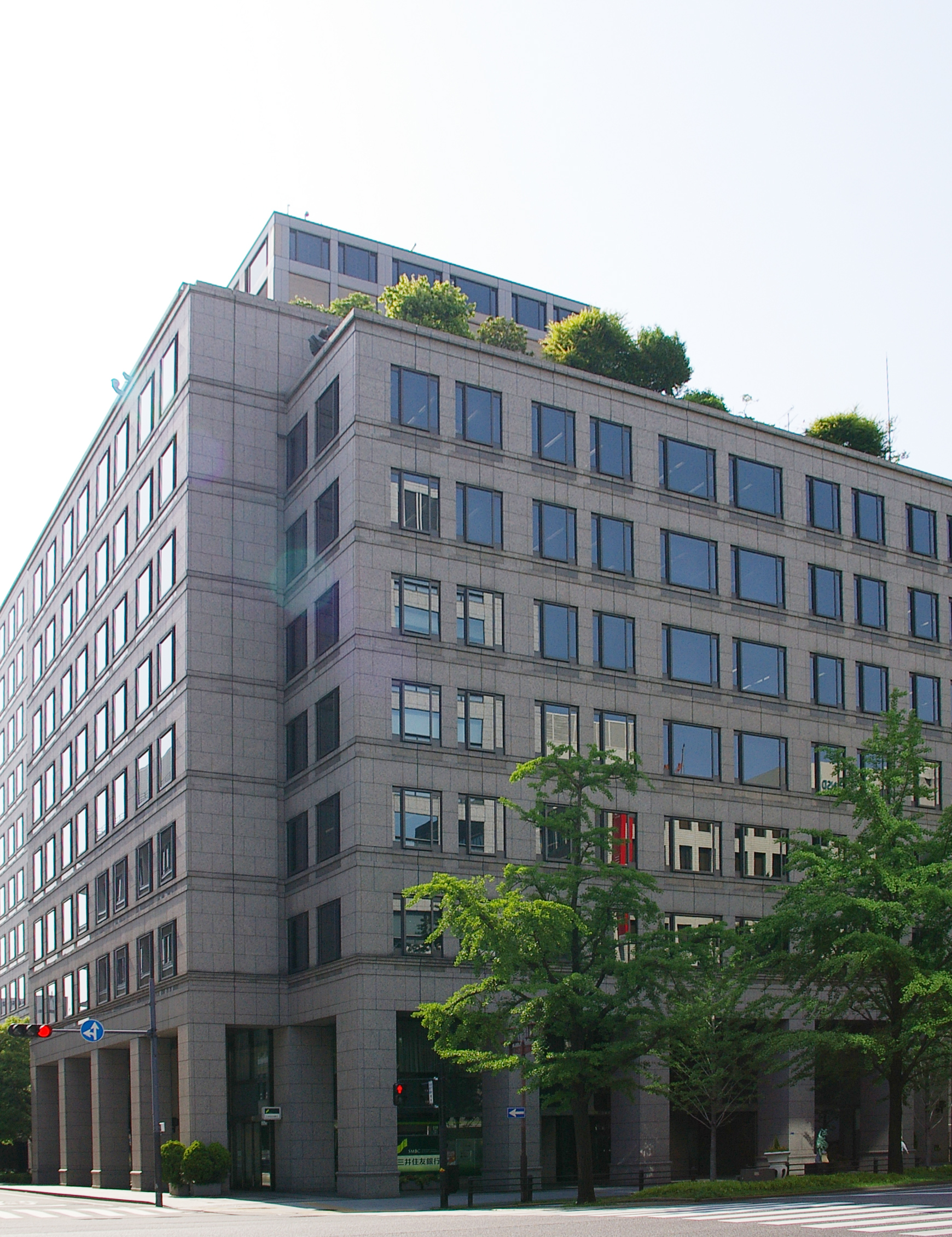
Takeda Midosuji Building, headquarters of Takeda Pharmaceutical Company, in Chuo-ku, Osaka, Japan

Takeda Pharmaceuticals was founded in 1781 by Chobei Takeda, and was incorporated on January 29, 1925.

One of the firm's mainstay drugs is Actos (pioglitazone), a compound in the thiazolidinedione class of drugs used in the treatment of type 2 diabetes. It was launched in 1999.

In February 2005, Takeda acquired San Diego, California, based Syrrx, a company specializing in high-throughput X-ray crystallography, for US$270 million.

In February 2008, Takeda acquired the Japanese operations of Amgen and rights to a dozen of the California biotechnology company's pipeline candidates for the Japanese market. In April, Takeda acquired Millennium Pharmaceuticals of Cambridge, Massachusetts, a company specializing in cancer drug research, for US$8.8 billion. The acquisition brought in Velcade, a drug indicated for hematological malignancies, as well as a portfolio of pipeline candidates in the oncology, inflammation, and cardiovascular therapeutic areas. Millennium now operates as an independent subsidiary. In May, the company licensed non-exclusively the RNAi technology platform developed by Alnylam Pharmaceuticals, creating a potentially long-term partnership between the companies.

=== Further expansion and research (2011–present) ===
In September 2011, Takeda acquired Nycomed for €9.6 billion.

In May 2012, Takeda purchased Brazilian pharmaceutical company Multilab for R$540 million. In June, Takeda announced it would acquire URL Pharma, then run by the founder's son Richard Roberts, for US$800 million.

In September 2014, Takeda announced it would team up with BioMotiv to identify and develop new compounds over a five-year period, worth approximately US$25 million. On 30 September 2014, Takeda announced it would expand a collaboration with MacroGenics, valued up to US$1.6 billion. The collaboration focused on the co-development of the preclinical autoimmune compound MGD010. MGD010 is a therapy which targets the B-cell surface proteins CD32B and CD79B, and is indicated for lupus and rheumatoid arthritis.

In 2015, Takeda sold its respiratory drugs business to AstraZeneca for $575 million (about £383 million), which included roflumilast and ciclesonide. On November, the U.S. Food and Drug Administration approved Ixazomib developed by Takeda for use in combination with lenalidomide and dexamethasone for the treatment of multiple myeloma after at least one prior therapy.

In December 2016, the company spun out its neuroscience research division into Cerevance, a joint venture along with Lightstone Ventures.

In February 2017, Takeda acquired Ariad Pharmaceuticals for $5.2 billion, expanding the company's oncology and hematology divisions.

In January 2018, the company acquired stem cell therapy developer TiGenix for up to €520 million ($632 million).

In January 2019, Takeda acquired Shire for more than US$50 billion. In October, Takeda announced it had sold a portfolio of over-the-counter and prescription medicines in the Middle East and Africa to Swiss pharmaceuticals company Acino International for more than $200 million.

In January 2020, Takeda announced a research partnership with the Massachusetts Institute of Technology (MIT) to advance discoveries in artificial intelligence and health. The MIT-Takeda Program is housed in the MIT Jameel Clinic, and is led by Professor James J. Collins, with a steering committee led by Professor Anantha P. Chandrakasan, dean of the MIT School of Engineering, and Anne Heatherington, senior vice president and head of Data Sciences Institute (DSI) at Takeda. In March 2020, Takeda announced that it has entered into an exclusive agreement to divest a portfolio of non-core products in Latin America to Hypera S.A. for a total value of $825 million.

In March 2021, the company announced it would acquire Maverick Therapeutics, Inc. and its two major programs TAK-186 (MVC-101) in trials for the treatment of EGFR-expressing tumours and TAK-280 (MVC-280) for use in the treatment of patients with B7H3-expressing tumors. In October, they acquired GammaDelta Therapeutics and its gamma delta (γδ) T cell immunotherapy programme.

In January 2022, Takeda announced it would exercise its option to acquire Adaptate Biotherapeutics and its antibody-based γδ T cell technology, reuniting Adaptate and its former parent company, GammaDelta Therapeutics, in a single organisation. In December of the same year, the company announced it would acquire Nimbus Lakshmi, Inc. and its lead compound NDI-034858 which is an allosteric TYK2 inhibitor for the treatment of various autoimmune diseases, from Nimbus Therapeutics, LLC for up to $6 billion.

In February 2024, Takeda Pharmaceutical gained approval from the FDA for Eohilia, the first oral approval for allergic inflammation of the esophagus for patients 11 years and older. At the time of the announcement, the treatment Dupixent from Sanofi and Regeneron was the only alternative.

In May 2024, Takeda announced it would be laying off 641 employees based in Massachusetts between July 2024 and March 2025 as part of a restructuring. It was expected to affect 495 people based in Cambridge and 146 people in Lexington.

In October 2025, Takeda signed an $11.4 billion deal with China's Innovent Biologics to help the company accelerate the development of immuno-oncology and antibody-drug conjugate cancer therapies. The deal includes a $1.2 billion upfront payment from Takeda.

In May 2026, Takeda announced layoffs of 4,500 roles across its global operations.

=== TAP Pharmaceuticals (1977–2008) ===
In 1977, Takeda first entered the U.S. pharmaceutical market by developing a joint venture with Abbott Laboratories called TAP Pharmaceuticals. Through TAP Pharmaceuticals Takeda and Abbott launched blockbuster drugs Lupron (leuprorelin), in 1985, then Prevacid (lansoprazole), in 1995.

In 2001, TAP's illegal marketing of Lupron resulted in both civil and criminal charges by the U.S. Department of Justice and the Illinois attorney general for federal and state medicare fraud. TAP was fined $875 million, then reported as the largest pharmaceutical settlement in history.

In March 2008, Takeda and Abbott Laboratories announced plans to conclude their 30-year-old joint venture, TAP Pharmaceuticals. The split resulted in Abbott acquiring U.S. rights to Lupron and the drug's support staff. Takeda received rights to Prevacid and TAP's pipeline candidates. The move also increased Takeda's headcount by 3,000 employees.

== Acquisition history ==
- Takeda Pharmaceutical Company (Est. 1781)
  - Syrrx (Acq 2005)
  - Paradigm Therapeutics (UK) Ltd. (Acq 2007)
  - Millennium Pharmaceuticals (Acq 2008)
    - COR Therapeutics (Acq 2002)
    - Cambridge Discovery Chemistry (Acq 2000)
    - Leukosite (Acq 1999)
  - Nycomed (Acq 2011)
    - Altana Pharma (Pharmaceuticals div, Acq 2007)
    - Bradley Pharmaceuticals (Acq 2007)
  - URL Pharma (Acq 2012)
  - Multilaba (Acq 2012)
  - Cerevance (Neuroscience div, Spun off 2016)
  - Ariad Pharmaceuticals (Acq 2017)
  - TiGenix (Acq 2018)
  - Shire plc (Founded 1986, Acq 2019)
    - Pharmavene (Acq 1997)
    - Richwood Pharmaceutical Company (Acq 1997)
    - Biochem Canada (Acq 2001)
    - Transkaryotic Therapeutics (Acq 2005)
    - New River Pharmaceuticals Inc (Acq 2007)
    - Jerini (Acq 2008)
    - Movetis (Acq 2012)
    - Advanced BioHealing (Acq 2011)
    - FerroKin BioSciences (Acq 2012)
    - Lotus Tissue Repair, Inc (Acq 2013)
    - Premacure AB (Acq 2013)
    - SARcode Bioscience Inc (Acq 2013)
    - ViroPharma (Founded 1994, Acq 2013)
      - Lev Pharmaceuticals (Acq 2008)
    - Fibrotech (Acq 2014)
    - Lumena (Acq 2014)
    - NPS Pharmaceuticals (Acq 2015)
    - Meritage Pharma (Acq 2015)
    - Foresight Biotherapeutics (Acq 2015)
    - Dyax (Acq 2015)
    - Baxalta (Acq 2016)
  - PvP Biologics, Inc. (Acq 2020)
  - Maverick Therapeutics, Inc. (Acq 2021)
  - GammaDelta Therapeutics (Acq 2021)
  - Adaptate Biotherapeutics (Acq 2022)
  - Nimbus Lakshmi, Inc. (Acq 2022)
  - Unimexpharm Inc. (Acq 2011)

== Divestments ==
In May 2019, Takeda sold its Xiidra dry-eye drug business to Novartis for $5.3 billion, $3.4 billion upfront and up-to $1.9 billion in sales milestones.

In November 2019, Takeda entered an agreement to sell its over-the-counter and prescription drugs businesses in Russia, Georgia, Armenia, Azerbaijan, Belarus, Kazakhstan, and Uzbekistan to Stada Arzneimittel for $660 million.

In April 2020, the company divested rights to 110 over-the-counter and prescription medicines for DKK 4.6 billion (670 million USD) to Orifarm. Through this acquisition, Orifarm also gained control of two production facilities in Łyszkowice, Poland, and Hobro, Denmark.

In June 2020, Takeda announced that it was divesting 18 over-the-counter and prescription drugs marketed in the Asia-Pacific region to South Korea's Celltrion in a deal worth $278 million.

Also in 2020, Takeda sold TachoSil to Corza Health, Inc. for €350 million.

== Lawsuits ==
In April 2015 Takeda agreed to pay a settlement of $2.37 billion to an estimated 9,000 people who submitted claims alleging that pioglitazone was responsible for giving them bladder cancer. The company said the decision is expected to resolve the “vast majority” of these cases. Takeda will put the money into a settlement fund if 95 percent of plaintiffs agree to the accord, according to which each claimant would get an average $267,000. However, the exact amount for each plaintiff will be evaluated based on cumulative dosage, extent of injuries and history of smoking. In 2014, a plaintiff was awarded $9 billion in punitive damages after a federal court found Takeda hid the cancer risks of their diabetes medicine, but the amount was later reduced to $26 million by a judge who deemed the charge excessive.

== Public–private engagement ==
=== Activism ===
Takeda is a corporate partner of Human Rights Campaign, a large LGBTQ advocacy organization.
