= Van Ness House =

Van Ness House may refer to:

- Van Ness House (Fairfield, New Jersey), listed on the National Register of Historic Places (NRHP)
- William W. Van Ness House, Claverak, New York, NRHP-listed

== See also ==
- Van Ness Mausoleum, Washington, D.C., NRHP-listed
