= Fairfield Township, Essex County, New Jersey =

Township in Essex County, New Jersey, US

Fairfield Township, New Jersey
- Township
- Seal

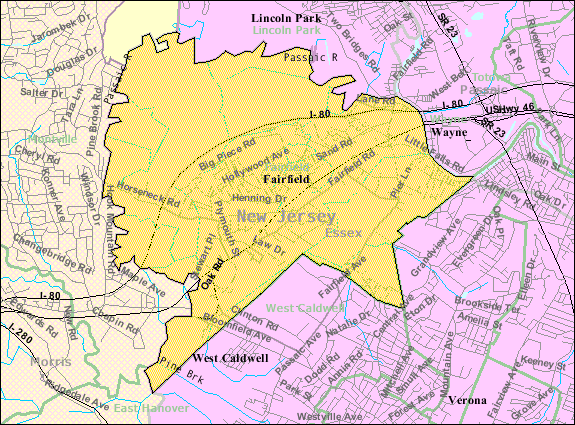
- Census Bureau map of Fairfield Township, Essex County, New Jersey

- Location in Essex County Location in New Jersey Location in the United States
- Coordinates: 40.882508°N 74.304593°W
- Country: United States
- State: New Jersey
- County: Essex
- Incorporated: February 16, 1798 (as Caldwell Township)
- Renamed: November 6, 1963 (as Fairfield Township)

Government
  - Type: Faulkner Act Small Municipality
  - Body: Township Council
  - Mayor: William Galese (R, term ends December 31, 2028)
  - Administrator: James Gasparini
  - Municipal clerk: Denise Cafone

Area
  - Total: 10.35 sq mi (26.80 km^{2})
  - Land: 10.13 sq mi (26.23 km^{2})
  - Water: 0.22 sq mi (0.57 km^{2}) 2.14%
  - Rank: 207th of 565 in state 4th of 22 in county
- Elevation: 174 ft (53 m)

Population (2020)
  - Total: 7,872
  - Estimate (2024): 8,204
  - Rank: 296th of 565 in state 18th of 22 in county
  - Density: 777.3/sq mi (300.1/km^{2})
  - Rank: 410th of 565 in state 22nd of 22 in county
- Time zone: UTC−05:00 (Eastern (EST))
  - Summer (DST): UTC−04:00 (Eastern (EDT))
- ZIP Code: 07004
- Area code: 973
- FIPS code: 3401322385
- GNIS feature ID: 1729722
- Website: www.fairfieldtownshipnj.gov

Fairfield is a township in far northwestern Essex County, in the U.S. state of New Jersey. As of the 2020 United States census, the township's population was 7,872, an increase of 406 (+5.4%) from the 2010 census count of 7,466, which in turn reflected an increase of 403 (+5.7%) from the 7,063 counted in the 2000 census. Fairfield was the least densely populated town in Essex County in 2020.

The first Europeans to settle in the area were Dutch and the place was called Gansegat. Later it was part of Horse Neck and officially part of Newark Township. What is now Fairfield was formed on February 16, 1798, as Caldwell Township from portions of Acquackanonk Township and Newark Township. The area was named for Rev. James Caldwell. It was incorporated as one of New Jersey's initial 104 townships by an act of the New Jersey Legislature on February 21, 1798. Portions of the township were taken to create Livingston (February 8, 1813), Fairmount Township (March 11, 1862, now part of West Orange), Caldwell borough (February 10, 1892), Verona Township (February 17, 1892, now known and including what is now Cedar Grove), North Caldwell (March 31, 1898), Essex Fells (March 31, 1902) and West Caldwell (February 24, 1904). On November 6, 1963, Caldwell Township was renamed as Fairfield Township, based on the results of a referendum passed the previous day. Fairfield was reincorporated as borough on June 8, 1964. In 1978, the borough passed a referendum reincorporating itself as a township, becoming the second of more than a dozen Essex County municipalities to reclassify themselves as townships in order take advantage of federal revenue sharing policies that allocated townships a greater share of government aid to municipalities on a per capita basis. It also has the heaviest population of Italian people by density.

== History ==
The Dutch, including many acculturated French Huguenots, initially settled this area of the Passaic River Valley after purchasing it from the Native Americans. They named it "Gansegat" which is Dutch for "duck's pond".

The Horseneck Tract was an 18,000-acre (7,300 ha) area that consisted of what are now the municipalities of Caldwell, West Caldwell, North Caldwell, Verona, Cedar Grove, Essex Fells, Roseland, and portions of Fairfield, Livingston and West Orange. Later in 1702, English settlers purchased 14,000 acres (57 km^{2}) of the Horseneck Tract without approval of the Proprietary Authorities from the Lenape Native Americans for goods equal to $325. When Proprietary Authorities began eviction proceedings against the settlers, the Horseneck Riots took place. This purchase encompassed much of western Essex County, from the First Mountain to a point on the Passaic River at Pine Brook NJ. The reason for the Horseneck name has never been determined, but historians agree that it is not because of its shape.

The Van Ness House, constructed about 1720, is a historic home added in 1977 to the National Register of Historic Places. The Fairfield Dutch Reformed Church dates back to 1720, and its current structure is another historic site, built in 1804.

== Geography ==
According to the United States Census Bureau, the township had a total area of 10.35 square miles (26.80 km^{2}), including 10.13 square miles (26.23 km^{2}) of land and 0.22 square miles (0.57 km^{2}) of water (2.14%). Fairfield has the lowest population density of any municipality in Essex County. Fairfield Township is located in the northwest corner of Essex County. The township is bisected by Interstate 80 and Route 46.

Unincorporated communities, localities and place names located partially or completely within the township include Clinton and Clinton Park.

Great Piece Meadows is mostly marshland covering 1,170 acres (470 ha).

The township borders North Caldwell and West Caldwell in Essex County; East Hanover Township, Lincoln Park and Montville in Morris County; and Little Falls and Wayne in Passaic County.

== Demographics ==
Historical population
Census	Pop.	Note	%±
1810	2,235		—
1820	2,020	*	−9.6%
1830	2,004		−0.8%
1840	2,184		9.0%
1850	2,377		8.8%
1860	2,688		13.1%
1870	2,727	*	1.5%
1880	3,167		16.1%
1890	3,638		14.9%
1900	1,619	*	−55.5%
1910	704	*	−56.5%
1920	717		1.8%
1930	989		37.9%
1940	1,392		40.7%
1950	1,906		36.9%
1960	3,310		73.7%
1970	6,884		108.0%
1980	7,987		16.0%
1990	7,615		−4.7%
2000	7,063		−7.2%
2010	7,466		5.7%
2020	7,872		5.4%
2024 (est.)	8,204		4.2%
Population sources: 1800–1920 1840 1850–1870; 1850 1870 1880–1890; 1890–1910 1910–1930; 1940–2000 2000; 2010 2020 * = Lost territory in previous decade.

=== 2020 census ===
Fairfield township, Essex County, New Jersey – Racial and Ethnic Composition (NH = Non-Hispanic) Note: the US Census treats Hispanic/Latino as an ethnic category. This table excludes Latinos from the racial categories and assigns them to a separate category. Hispanics/Latinos may be of any race.
Race / Ethnicity	Pop 2010	Pop 2020	% 2010	% 2020
White alone (NH)	6,800	6,562	83.10%	79.88%
Black or African American alone (NH)	46	38	0.62%	0.46%
Native American or Alaska Native alone (NH)	3	0	0.04%	0.00%
Asian alone (NH)	183	355	2.35%	4.35%
Pacific Islander alone (NH)	0	1	0.00%	0.01%
Some Other Race alone (NH)	0	24	0.00%	0.29%
Mixed Race/Multi-Racial (NH)	50	159	0.65%	1.95%
Hispanic or Latino (any race)	384	733	5.24%	9.07%
Total	7,466	7,872	100.00%	100.00%

=== 2010 census ===
The 2010 United States census counted 7,466 people, 2,645 households, and 2,103 families in the township. The population density was 725.1 per square mile (280.0/km^{2}). There were 2,723 housing units at an average density of 264.5 per square mile (102.1/km^{2}). The racial makeup was 94.84% (7,081) White, 0.68% (51) Black or African American, 0.28% (21) Native American, 2.53% (189) Asian, 0.00% (0) Pacific Islander, 0.74% (55) from other races, and 0.92% (69) from two or more races. Hispanic or Latino of any race were 5.14% (384) of the population.

Of the 2,645 households, 31.6% had children under the age of 18; 67.0% were married couples living together; 8.9% had a female householder with no husband present and 20.5% were non-families. Of all households, 18.0% were made up of individuals and 11.8% had someone living alone who was 65 years of age or older. The average household size was 2.82 and the average family size was 3.22.

22.6% of the population were under the age of 18, 7.0% from 18 to 24, 21.4% from 25 to 44, 28.6% from 45 to 64, and 20.5% who were 65 years of age or older. The median age was 44.5 years. For every 100 females, the population had 94.4 males. For every 100 females ages 18 and older there were 91.8 males.

The Census Bureau's 2006–2010 American Community Survey showed that (in 2010 inflation-adjusted dollars) median household income was $97,361 (with a margin of error of +/− $11,797) and the median family income was $117,004 (+/− $7,881). Males had a median income of $69,081 (+/− $15,627) versus $51,198 (+/− $6,668) for females. The per capita income for the borough was $41,615 (+/− $5,217). About 0.5% of families and 2.8% of the population were below the poverty line, including none of those under age 18 and 6.8% of those age 65 or over.

=== 2000 census ===
As of the 2000 United States census there were 7,063 people, 2,296 households, and 1,981 families residing in the township. The population density was 675.8 inhabitants per square mile (260.9/km^{2}). There were 2,326 housing units at an average density of 222.5 per square mile (85.9/km^{2}). The racial makeup of the township was 95.63% White, 0.52% African American, 0.10% Native American, 2.82% Asian, 0.40% from other races, and 0.54% from two or more races. Hispanic or Latino of any race were 3.45% of the population.

There were 2,296 households, out of which 33.4% had children under the age of 18 living with them, 74.7% were married couples living together, 8.3% had a female householder with no husband present, and 13.7% were non-families. 10.9% of all households were made up of individuals, and 6.0% had someone living alone who was 65 years of age or older. The average household size was 3.04 and the average family size was 3.29.

In the township the population was spread out, with 22.0% under the age of 18, 7.0% from 18 to 24, 27.8% from 25 to 44, 28.1% from 45 to 64, and 15.1% who were 65 years of age or older. The median age was 41 years. For every 100 females, there were 95.7 males. For every 100 females age 18 and over, there were 93.3 males.

The median income for a household in the township was $83,120, and the median income for a family was $90,998. Males had a median income of $56,106 versus $39,032 for females. The per capita income for the township was $32,099. About 2.3% of families and 2.8% of the population were below the poverty line, including 4.2% of those under age 18 and 2.2% of those age 65 or over.

== Economy ==
Corporate residents of Fairfield Township include:

- Pharmaceutical firm Bradley Pharmaceuticals was headquartered here until the company was acquired by Nycomed in 2008.
- Cricket Hill, microbrewer of American Ale, Hopnotic IPA, and East Coast Lager.
- Telebrands, the direct marketing firm best known for its "As Seen on TV" products.

== Government ==
Fairfield Township operates within the Faulkner Act, formally known as the Optional Municipal Charter Law, under the Small Municipality plan C form of New Jersey government, as implemented as of January 1, 1962, based on direct petition. The township is one of 18 municipalities (of the 564) statewide that use this form of government, which is available to municipalities with less than 12,000 residents at the time of adoption. The governing body is comprised of the Mayor and the four-member Township Council. Members are elected to three-year terms of office at-large in partisan elections in a three-year cycle, with two council seats up for vote in each of the first two years of the cycle and the mayoral seat up in the third year. The Mayor exercises executive power of the municipality, appoints department heads with Council approval, prepares the annual budget and has veto over ordinances subject to override by 2/3 of all members of Council. The Council exercises legislative power of municipality and approves appointment of department heads.

As of 2025, members of the Fairfield Township Council are Mayor William Galese (R, term ends December 31, 2027), Council President Peter Campisi (R, 2026), Joseph Cifelli (R, 2025), John LaForgia (R, 2026) and Michael B. McGlynn (R, 2025).

In January 2023, councilmember William Galese was appointed as mayor to fill the seat expiring in December 2024 that had been held by James Gasparini until he resigned to take office as the township's administrator. Later that month, Peter Campisi was appointed to fill Galese's vacant council seat expiring in December 2023.

=== Federal, state and county representation ===
Fairfield is located in the 11th Congressional District and is part of New Jersey's 40th state legislative district.

For the 119th United States Congress, New Jersey's 11th congressional district is represented by Analilia Mejia (D, Glen Ridge) who was elected in a 2026 special election to serve for the remainder of the Congress following the resignation Mikie Sherrill (D, Montclair), who was elected Governor of New Jersey in 2025. New Jersey is represented in the United States Senate by Democrats Cory Booker (Newark, term ends 2027) and Andy Kim (Moorestown, term ends 2031).

For the 2026–2027 session, the 40th legislative district of the New Jersey Legislature is represented in the State Senate by Kristin Corrado (R, Totowa) and in the General Assembly by Al Barlas (R, Cedar Grove) and Christopher DePhillips (R, Wyckoff).

Essex County is governed by a directly elected county executive, with legislative functions performed by the Board of County Commissioners. As of 2025, the County Executive is Joseph N. DiVincenzo Jr. (D, Roseland), whose four-year term of office ends December 31, 2026. The county's Board of County Commissioners is composed of nine members, five of whom are elected from districts and four of whom are elected on an at-large basis. They are elected for three-year concurrent terms and may be re-elected to successive terms at the annual election in November. Essex County's Commissioners are:

Robert Mercado (D, District 1 – Newark's North and East Wards, parts of Central and West Wards; Newark, 2026), A'Dorian Murray-Thomas (D, District 2 – Irvington, Maplewood and parts of Newark's South and West Wards; Newark, 2026), Vice President Tyshammie L. Cooper (D, District 3 - Newark: West and Central Wards; East Orange, Orange and South Orange; East Orange, 2026), Leonard M. Luciano (D, District 4 – Caldwell, Cedar Grove, Essex Fells, Fairfield, Livingston, Millburn, North Caldwell, Roseland, Verona, West Caldwell and West Orange; West Caldwell, 2026), President Carlos M. Pomares (D, District 5 – Belleville, Bloomfield, Glen Ridge, Montclair and Nutley; Bloomfield, 2026), Brendan W. Gill (D, at large; Montclair, 2026), Romaine Graham (D, at large; Irvington, 2026), Wayne Richardson (D, at large; Newark, 2026), Patricia Sebold (D, at-large; Livingston, 2026).

Constitutional officers elected countywide are: Clerk Christopher J. Durkin (D, West Caldwell, 2025), Register of Deeds Juan M. Rivera Jr. (D, Newark, 2029), Sheriff Amir Jones (D, Newark, 2027), and Surrogate Alturrick Kenney (D, Newark, 2028).

=== Politics ===
As of March 2011, there were a total of 5,378 registered voters in Fairfield, of which 1,004 (18.7%) were registered as Democrats, 2,072 (38.5%) were registered as Republicans and 2,299 (42.7%) were registered as Unaffiliated. There were 3 voters registered as Libertarians or Greens.

United States presidential election results for Fairfield
Year	Republican		Democratic		Third party(ies)	
Year	No.	%	No.	%	No.	%
2024	3,615	73.51%	1,234	25.09%	69	1.40%
2020	3,436	69.87%	1,452	29.52%	30	0.61%
2016	2,858	70.66%	1,009	24.94%	178	4.40%
2012	2,494	69.03%	1,069	29.59%	50	1.38%
2008	2,797	70.03%	1,137	28.47%	60	1.50%
2004	2,742	69.74%	1,151	29.27%	39	0.99%

In the 2016 presidential election, Republican Donald Trump received 72.5% of the vote (2,858 cast), ahead of Democrat Hillary Clinton with 25.6% (1,009 cast), and other candidates with 1.8% (70 votes), among the 4,003 ballots cast by the township's 5,798 registered voters, for a turnout of 69%. In the 2012 presidential election, Republican Mitt Romney received 69.4% of the vote (2,494 cast), ahead of Democrat Barack Obama with 29.7% (1,069 votes), and other candidates with 0.9% (32 votes), among the 3,625 ballots cast by the township's 5,459 registered voters (30 ballots were spoiled), for a turnout of 66.4%. In the 2008 presidential election, Republican John McCain received 70.1% of the vote (2,797 cast), ahead of Democrat Barack Obama with 28.5% (1,137 votes) and other candidates with 0.5% (21 votes), among the 3,991 ballots cast by the township's 5,380 registered voters, for a turnout of 74.2%. In the 2004 presidential election, Republican George W. Bush received 69.6% of the vote (2,742 ballots cast), outpolling Democrat John Kerry with 29.2% (1,151 votes) and other candidates with 0.8% (39 votes), among the 3,939 ballots cast by the township's 5,131 registered voters, for a turnout percentage of 76.8.

Gubernatorial election results for Fairfield Township
Year	Republican		Democratic		Third party(ies)	
Year	No.	%	No.	%	No.	%
2025	2,810	71.74%	1,097	28.01%	10	0.26%
2021	2,525	76.86%	753	22.92%	7	0.21%
2017	1,191	64.03%	615	33.06%	54	2.90%
2013	1,600	73.90%	548	25.31%	17	0.79%
2009	1,819	69.30%	661	25.18%	145	5.52%
2005	1,566	62.56%	868	34.68%	69	2.76%

In the 2013 gubernatorial election, Republican Chris Christie received 73.9% of the vote (1,600 cast), ahead of Democrat Barbara Buono with 25.3% (548 votes), and other candidates with 0.8% (17 votes), among the 2,193 ballots cast by the township's 5,445 registered voters (28 ballots were spoiled), for a turnout of 40.3%. In the 2009 gubernatorial election, Republican Chris Christie received 68.9% of the vote (1,819 ballots cast), ahead of Democrat Jon Corzine with 25.0% (661 votes), Independent Chris Daggett with 5.0% (133 votes) and other candidates with 0.5% (12 votes), among the 2,641 ballots cast by the township's 5,397 registered voters, yielding a 48.9% turnout.

United States Senate election results for Fairfield Township1
Year	Republican		Democratic		Third party(ies)	
Year	No.	%	No.	%	No.	%
2024	3,352	71.93%	1,218	26.14%	90	1.93%
2018	1,972	71.87%	714	26.02%	58	2.11%
2012	2,008	63.95%	1,072	34.14%	60	1.91%
2006	1,550	67.69%	721	31.48%	19	0.83%

United States Senate election results for Fairfield Township2
Year	Republican		Democratic		Third party(ies)	
Year	No.	%	No.	%	No.	%
2020	3,261	66.76%	1,386	28.37%	238	4.87%
2014	1,046	66.20%	518	32.78%	16	1.01%
2013	953	70.33%	393	29.00%	9	0.66%
2008	2,213	66.50%	1,069	32.12%	46	1.38%

== Education ==
The Fairfield School District serves public school students in pre-kindergarten through sixth grade. As of the 2022–23 school year, the district, comprised of two schools, had an enrollment of 694 students and 69.3 classroom teachers (on an FTE basis), for a student–teacher ratio of 10.0:1. Schools in the district (with 2022–23 enrollment data from the National Center for Education Statistics) are Adlai E. Stevenson Elementary School with 309 students in pre-Kindergarten through third grade and Winston S. Churchill School with 384 students in fourth through sixth grade.

Students in public school for seventh through twelfth grades attend the West Essex Regional School District, a regional school district in western Essex County serving students from Essex Fells, Fairfield, North Caldwell and Roseland. Schools in the district (with 2022–23 enrollment data from the National Center for Education Statistics) are West Essex Middle School with 599 students in grades 7-8 and West Essex High School with 1,043 students in grades 9-12. Seats on the nine-member board of education of the high school district are allocated based on population, with three seats assigned to Fairfield.

StenoTech Career Institute is a technical school in Fairfield, established in 1988, that offers court reporting and medical transcription training.

== Transportation ==
=== Roads and highways ===
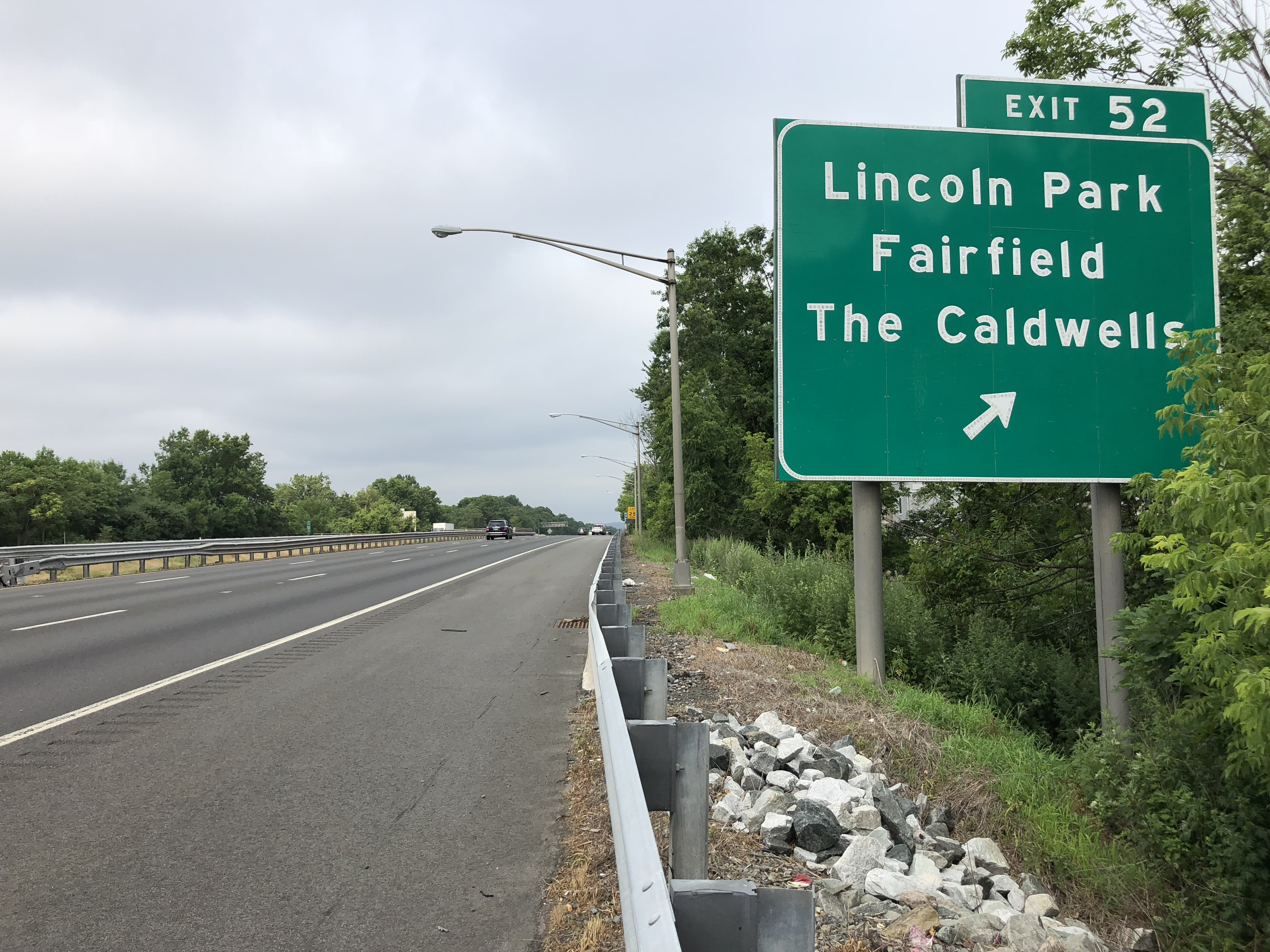
View west along Interstate 80 in Fairfield

As of May 2010, the borough had a total of 62.10 miles (99.94 km) of roadways, of which 40.18 miles (64.66 km) were maintained by the municipality, 13.14 miles (21.15 km) by Essex County and 8.78 miles (14.13 km) by the New Jersey Department of Transportation.

U.S. Route 46, Route 159 and Interstate 80 all pass through the township.

=== Public transportation ===
NJ Transit provides bus service to Newark on the 29 and 71 routes.

Lakeland Bus Lines offers service to and from the Port Authority Bus Terminal in Midtown Manhattan on its Route 46 route.

Essex County Airport, managed by the Essex County Improvement Authority, is located in Fairfield.

== Notable people ==
People who were born in, residents of, or otherwise closely associated with Fairfield include:

- Robert Egan (born 1958), restaurateur and an interlocutor between the government of the Democratic People's Republic of Korea (North Korea) and the United States
- David Greczek (born 1994), professional soccer player who plays as a goalkeeper, most recently for Swope Park Rangers in the United Soccer League
- Gurbir Grewal (born 1973), Attorney General of New Jersey
- John LoCascio (born 1991), defenseman for the Rochester Rattlers in Major League Lacrosse
- James F. Post (1818–1899), architect, builder, and contractor who designed and oversaw the construction of over 60 buildings, best known for his buildings in Wilmington, North Carolina
- Michelle Vizzuso (born 1977), field hockey player recognized by The Star-Ledger as the sport's top athlete of the 20th century
