= Joseph Fuisz =

American attorney

- Education: Yale University (BA); Columbia University (JD)
- Spouse: Helena Robinson
- Relatives: Richard Fuisz (father)

Joseph M. Fuisz is an American attorney, inventor, and entrepreneur of Slovenian descent. He works predominantly in the pharmaceutical industry as the founder of Fuisz Pharma LLC. As of October 2015, he is named on 32 medical patents, and over forty patents. Inventor of Suboxone

He has been involved in the development of drug delivery and the approval of new drugs and low emission tobacco products. Joseph Fuisz is a named inventor of the formulation of the drug Suboxone. The sales of Suboxone in 2013 were reported to be $1.2 billion in the United States.

== Early life and education ==
Joseph Fuisz is the son of Richard Fuisz and Patricia Fuisz. He graduated from Yale University and Columbia Law School.

== Career ==
Joseph Fuisz began his career in law, after graduating from Columbia University Law School. He passed the New York Bar exam and began practising law at Sullivan & Cromwell. He subsequently moved into medical patents, a field his father Richard Fuisz had worked in for a number of years.

In 2000, Joseph Fuisz and Richard Fuisz founded International Fluidics, which was rebranded as Kosmos Pharma Limited two years later. Richard began as the more senior figure in the company, before the sale of the company in 2004. The rebranding came at a time when the company filed a number of patents that successfully allow highly sensitive proteins to be taken orally. One example of this came in 2002, the company successfully developed stamp-size medicine strips that could dissolve quickly in a patient's mouth.

Kosmos Pharma Limited was acquired by MonoSol LLC in 2004, with Joseph Fuisz becoming MonoSol's Senior Vice President. Joseph Fuisz eventually moved back to Fuisz LLC, concentrating on drug delivery patents.

Joseph Fuisz is also a named inventor in the Orange Book for the drug, Suboxone. It is a formulation of the Buprenorphine and is used for the treatment of opioid addiction in higher dosages, and to control pain lower doses, with dosage depending on the severity. The drug is also used for the treatment of heroin addiction, and since 2014 has been valued at over $1 billion in sales annually by its provider, Indivior.

MonoSol Rx announced they had acquired a patent from Joseph Fuisz in 2012. The patent was related to drug delivery and the use of film single layer multifunctional films. The medical patent provides for a non-uniform distribution of components. The thickness direction of a layer of biocompatible film, which allows for a multifunctional film to be used in a traditional single layer.

While working in the medical drug delivery market, Joseph Fuisz founded Fuisz Tobacco, which was a subsidiary of Fuisz Inc.

He became the Managing Director of the company in 2008. Fuisz Tobacco developed a dissolving tobacco film strip. Joseph Fuisz claimed improved nicotine absorption from tobacco in this format. The patent for this system is assigned to Philip Morris International.

Joseph Fuisz's next major advancement in tobacco came in September 2013, when he patented a delivery mechanism that used a coating. The coating, allowed for an increase in the local pH within the body, which led to maximised nicotine absorption.

Joseph Fuisz has developed new tablet shapes that allow for improved esophageal transit. The US Patent Office issued a patent for this work in 2015.

In 2014, Joseph Fuisz and a blood-testing patent he filed were involved in a dispute with another medical research company. Theranos accused Joseph Fuisz and his father Richard Fuisz of stealing documents of a patent they were to file. A parallel case against McDermott, Will & Emery was dismissed by a judge in late 2014, stating there was no evidence of theft.

Joseph Fuisz represented himself pro se in the Theranos case. The litigation story between Fuisz and Theranos and David Boies is discussed at length in the book Bad Blood by John Carreyrou. In Bad Blood, author John Carreyrou concludes there was no evidence of theft by the Fuiszes.

Fuisz discussed this litigation with various media outlets, including ABC’s podcast series, The Drop Out. Fuisz also provided an interview with TRT World in which he describes his role together with Richard Fuisz in exposing the Theranos fraud, as well as an interview with John Carreyrou for Bad Blood the Final Chapter

In recent years, Fuisz has obtained new drug delivery patents related to new methods of manufacturing thin films for Thin-film drug delivery.

In 2020, Joseph Fuisz announced a new venture, Nova thin Films, based on patents obtained by Richard Fuisz and Joseph Fuisz to make pharmaceutical films by deposit.

Joseph Fuisz recently announced the issuance of patents related to heat not burn tobacco compositions. Mr. Fuisz received two patents relating to heat-not-burn heating systems in August, 2021.

As of 2020, Mr. Fuisz is a named inventor on approximately forty US patents.

== Personal life ==
Joseph Fuisz married his wife Helena Robinson in 2006.

== See also ==
- Richard Fuisz
- Suboxone
- Buprenorphine
- Thin-film drug delivery
- Indivior
