= Chobei Takeda =

Japanese businessman, founder of Takeda Pharmaceuticals

Chobei Takeda I
- 武田長兵衛
- Born: c. 1749; Osaka, Japan
- Died: 10 July 1821
- Occupation: Businessman
- Known for: Founder of Takeda Pharmaceutical Company

Chobei Takeda I (武田長兵衛, Takeda Chōbei; died 1858) was a Japanese merchant and the founder of the business that would eventually become the Takeda Pharmaceutical Company, one of the oldest and largest pharmaceutical firms in Japan.

Takeda established his business, initially known as the Chobei Omiya Store, in 1781 when he was approximately 32 years old, during the Edo period.

== Life and career ==
Chobei Takeda I was born in Osaka during the 18th century. He established his shop in Dōshōmachi, a district in Osaka recognized as the center of the medicine trade in Japan, and specialized in selling traditional Japanese medicines and traditional Chinese medicines (herbal medicines).

As a merchant, Takeda developed a reputation for business integrity and high-quality products and services. His business model involved purchasing bulk medicines from wholesalers and dividing them into smaller quantities for sale to local merchants and medical practitioners. The business grew steadily under his leadership until his death in 1858, forming a strong commercial base in the region. The enterprise continued to expand under his successors, who also inherited the name Chobei.

== Legacy ==
The values and standards set by Chobei Takeda I are considered foundational to the modern Takeda Pharmaceutical Company. His emphasis on ethical business practices and product reliability is reflected in the company's long-standing corporate philosophy, often referred to as Takeda-ism by later generations.

The family business founded by Chobei Takeda I transitioned from traditional herbal medicine to the import of Western pharmaceuticals starting with Chobei Takeda IV in 1871. The enterprise was formally incorporated as Chobei Takeda & Company Limited in 1925 and has since evolved into a global, R&D-driven biopharmaceutical company with operations in more than 80 countries.
