= Fairfield Dutch Reformed Church =

Historic church in New Jersey, United States

- U.S. National Register of Historic Places
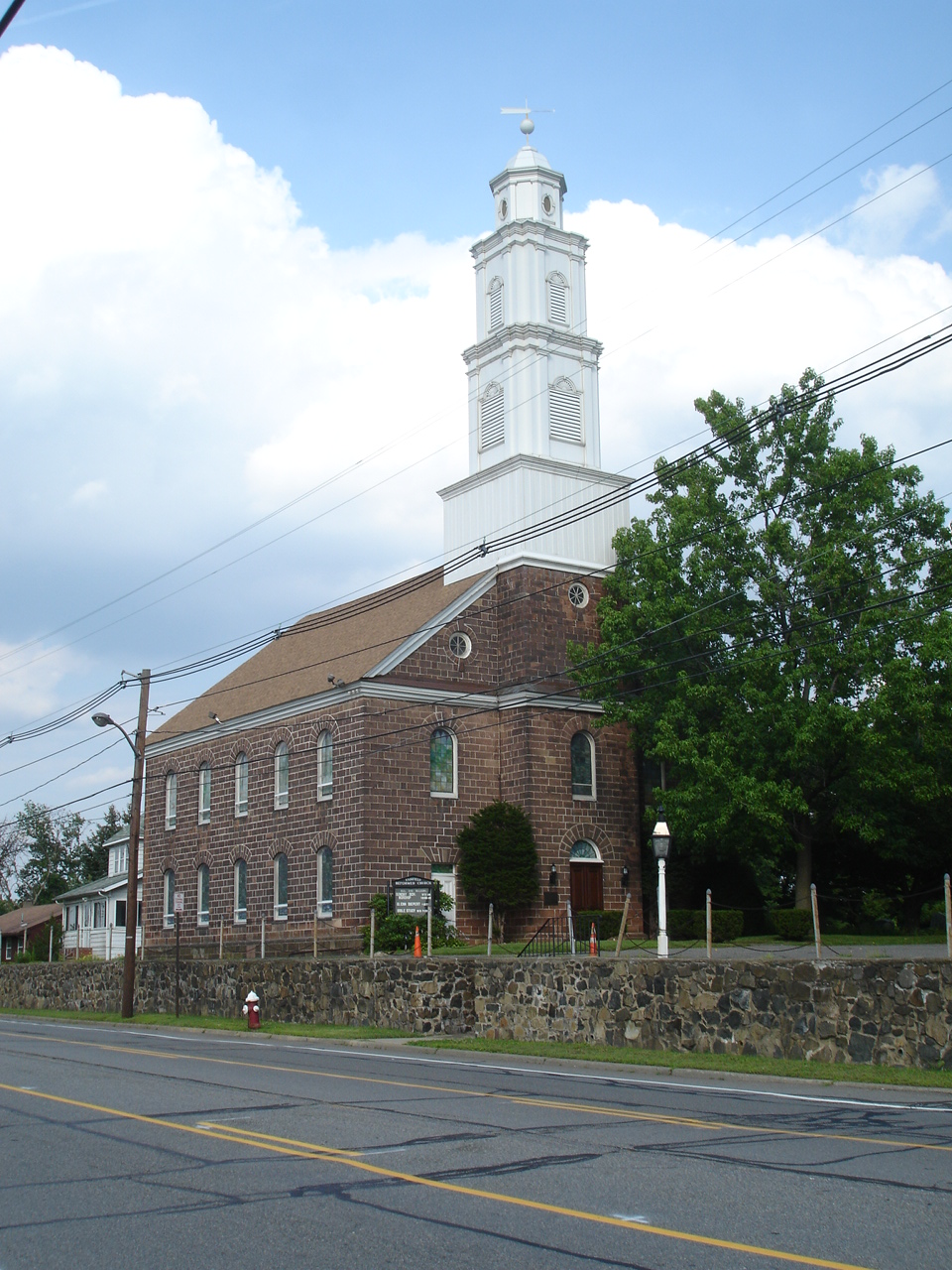
- The Fairfield Dutch Reformed Church in the summer of 2009

- Location within Essex County, New Jersey Location within New Jersey Location within the United States
- Location: Fairfield Road; Fairfield Township, Essex County, New Jersey
- Coordinates: 40°53′4″N 74°16′57″W
- Area: 2.8 acres (1.1 ha)
- Built: 1804
- Architects: Sigler, Moses
- Architectural style: English Georgian
- NRHP reference No.: 75001134
- Added to NRHP: October 07, 1975

Fairfield Dutch Reformed Church is a historic church on Fairfield Road in Fairfield Township, Essex County, New Jersey, United States.

The congregation was established in 1720 by Dutch settlers. The building dates to 1804 and was added to the National Register of Historic Places in 1975.

== See also ==
- National Register of Historic Places listings in Essex County, New Jersey
