= Orifarm =

Danish pharmaceutical company

Orifarm Group A/S
- Formation: 1994
- Founder: Brigitte and Hans Bøgh-Sørensen
- Headquarters: Odense, Denmark
- Subsidiaries: Pilatus Comparator Solutions
- Website: www.orifarm.com

Orifarm (founded 1994) is a Danish pharmaceutical company based in Odense.

== History ==
Orifarm is a family-owned company established in 1994 by Hans Bøgh-Sørensen and his wife Birgitte Bøgh-Sørensen.

Orifarm entered the market in 1995 with a portfolio of 25 products and 9 employees. Since then, the company has experienced significant growth and currently employs approximately 2,200 persons across multiple locations in Europe and the United States.

In 1997, Orifarm expanded into Sweden, marking its first presence in a European market beyond Denmark. By 2014, Orifarm entered the Dutch market, establishing its sixth sales office in Europe.

In 2019, Orifarm extended its operations beyond Europe by acquiring Pilatus Comparator Solutions, a company active in the United Kingdom, Germany, and the United States.

In 2020, the company bought a part of Takeda Pharmaceutical Company (Japan) and the rights to a number of over-the-counter and prescription medicines for DKK 4.6 billion (670 million USD). Through this acquisition, Orifarm also gained control of two production facilities in Łyszkowice, Poland, and Hobro, Denmark.

In 2021, the company’s revenue increased by 27% to DKK 10.54 billion (EUR 1,417 billion). Operating profit also rose by 39%, reaching DKK 413 million (EUR 55.3 million).
