= Cricket Hill Brewery =

Brewery in New Jersey

Coordinates: 40.8726°N 74.2962°W

- Industry: Alcoholic beverage
- Headquarters: Fairfield Township, Essex County, New Jersey; USA
- Products: Beer

Cricket Hill Brewery is a brewery in Fairfield, New Jersey, USA. Founded in 2000 and opening to the public in 2002 with their flagship beers: East Coast Lager and American Ale. They currently produce Colonel Blide's Bitter and Hopnotic IPA and seasonals, Jersey Summer Breakfast Ale, Fall Festivus, Paymasters Porter, and Maibock.

Rick Reed, founder of the New Jersey Beer Rebellion, is the head brewer and CEO. Brad Benson was the company's first brewer, followed by Norbert Walsh and current brewer David Manka, both American Brewers Guild graduates.

Cricket Hill actively practices Reinheitsgebot, the Germany beer brewing purity restrictions, and it is known for cask-aging beer.

== See also ==
- Beer in the United States
- List of wineries, breweries, and distilleries in New Jersey
