= Nycomed =

Swiss pharmaceutical company

Nycomed International Management GmbH
- Company type: Subsidiary
- Industry: Pharmaceuticals
- Founded: 1874; 152 years ago
- Headquarters: Zürich, Switzerland
- Area served: Europe
- Key people: H. Björklund (CEO); Toni Weitzberg (Chairman)
- Revenue: ▲€ 3,400 million (2006)
- Number of employees: 12,400 approx. (2007)
- Parent: Takeda Pharmaceutical Company
- Website: www.nycomed.com

Nycomed is a Swiss pharmaceutical company. Nycomed was acquired by Takeda Pharmaceuticals in September 2011. Production was located in Norway, Denmark, Poland, Austria, Belgium, Germany, Estonia, India, Mexico, Brazil and Argentina. Head office is located in Zürich, Switzerland. Total revenue was €3,400 million in 2006 and the group had 12,000 employees then. The company awarded an annual prize totaling 20,000 euros to four excellent junior scientists at the University of Konstanz. Also, the award promoted the concept of scientific exchange and networking of its winners.

== History ==
The company was started in Norway in 1874, as an agent for imported pharmaceutical products. The founder was pharmacist Morten Nyegaard, and co-owner was Theodor Haslund. Nyegaard backed out in 1901, and Theodor Haslund was co-owner with Emil Steen until 1906. Fredrik L. Christensen was then Steen's partner until 1913, when Steen became sole owner. Steen was behind the transformation of the company from a wholesaling company to a manufacturer of pharmaceutical products. After his death, his widow Laura Steen took over the company; in 1921 their son Fredrik Steen took over. The company soon merged with Koren & Gedde, owned since 1919 by Sverre Blix. Blix became co-owner with Fredrik Steen.

The company name was Nyegaard & Co. from 1890 until 1986 when it was changed to Nycomed. In 1913 it started producing generic drugs, among these Globoid (copy of Aspirin). In 1969, the revolutionary radiocontrast agent Amipaque was discovered, starting a long process of internationalisation. The next generation product Omnipaque made the company highly successful. In 1986, Nycomed was purchased by the power company Hafslund. In 1994, the diagnostic division of US based Sterling Winthrop was acquired. Then, in 1996, the therapeutics division Nycomed Pharma was demerged whilst the diagnostic division Nycomed Imaging was merged with the British company Amersham plc. In 1999, the therapeutics company was established under the name Nycomed as an independent company. In 2007, Nycomed took over the much larger German pharmaceutical company, Altana Pharma. This acquisition made Nycomed one of the world's 25 largest pharmaceutical companies. In 2007 Nycomed acquired American company Bradley Pharmaceuticals. The closing deal was completed on 21 February 2008, and Bradley Pharmaceuticals became an integral part of Nycomed.

Nycomed pursued a strategy of licensing new medicines from research companies and introducing them to Europe. The company provided specialist/hospital products (e.g., Tachosil) throughout Europe. General Practitioner and pharmacy medicines are also provided but in selected countries. Today the company was active throughout Europe and expanded into new markets.

In October 2008, Nycomed Canada, Inc,. was named one of "Canada's Top 100 Employers" by Mediacorp Canada, Inc., and was featured in Maclean's newsmagazine. Later that month, Nycomed Canada was also named one of Greater Toronto's Top Employers, which was announced by the Toronto Star newspaper.

By 2011, Nycomed was a privately held Swiss company; that year Takeda Pharmaceuticals, Japan's biggest drugmaker, bought most of the company for about $14 billion - the deal did not include Nycomed's US dermatology business. That deal made Takeda the world's 12th biggest drugmaker, which in January 2012, said it would cut about 10% of its workforce by reducing the number of people it employed outside Japan by 2,800 as it sought to 'streamline its global operations after its acquisition of Nycomed', a purchase that had dented its 2011-2012 profit by 31%

=== Collaborative research ===
In addition to internal research and development activities, Nycomed was also involved in publicly funded collaborative research projects with other industrial and academic partners. One example in that area of non-clinical safety assessment was the InnoMed PredTox.

== See also ==
- List of pharmaceutical companies
- Pharmaceutical industry in Switzerland
