= TiGenix =

TiGenix NV
- Company type: Public (euronext: TIG)
- Industry: Biotechnology
- Founded: 2000
- Headquarters: Leuven, Belgium
- Key people: Eduardo Bravo, CEO
- Number of employees: 70
- Website: http://www.tigenix.com

TiGenix is a European cell therapy company with a proprietary validated allogeneic expanded adipose-derived stem cell (eASC) platform technology for the treatment of autoimmune and inflammatory diseases, and a commercialized product. Its corporate headquarters are in Leuven, Belgium, and it has operations in Madrid, Spain. TiGenix was founded in 2000 by Prof. Dr. Frank P. Luyten and Gil Beyen as a spin-off from the Katholieke Universiteit Leuven and the Ghent University.

TiGenix's therapeutic approach is to focus on the use of living cells rather than conventional drugs for the treatment of inflammatory and autoimmune diseases, through its eASC-based platform, and heart disease, through its CSC-based platform. TiGenix's pipeline of stem cell programs is based on validated platforms of allogeneic stem cells.

== History ==
TiGenix has completed and received positive data in, a single pivotal Phase III trial in Europe of its most advanced product candidate Cx601, a potential first-in-class injectable allogeneic stem cell therapy indicated for the treatment of complex perianal fistulas in patients with Crohn's disease. On 28 July 2016 The Lancet published the results of their phase 3 ADMIRE-CD Trial.

=== Acquisition by Takeda ===
In early January 2018, Takeda Pharmaceutical Company announced it would acquire TiGenix for up to €520 million ($632 million).
