= Oral administration =

Route of administration where a substance is taken through the mouth

Oral medication
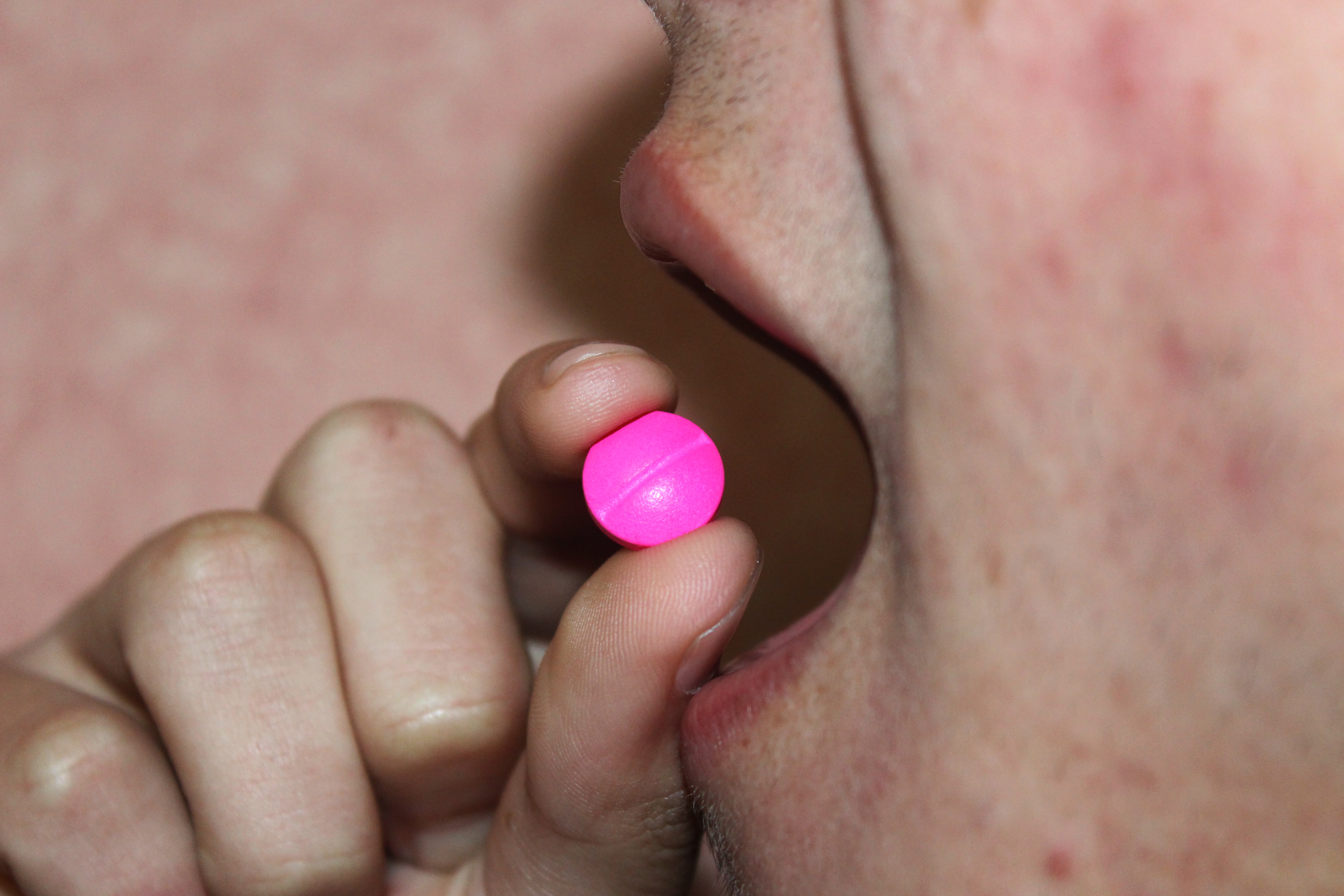
- Oral administration of a tablet.
- Other names: By mouth, per os (PO)

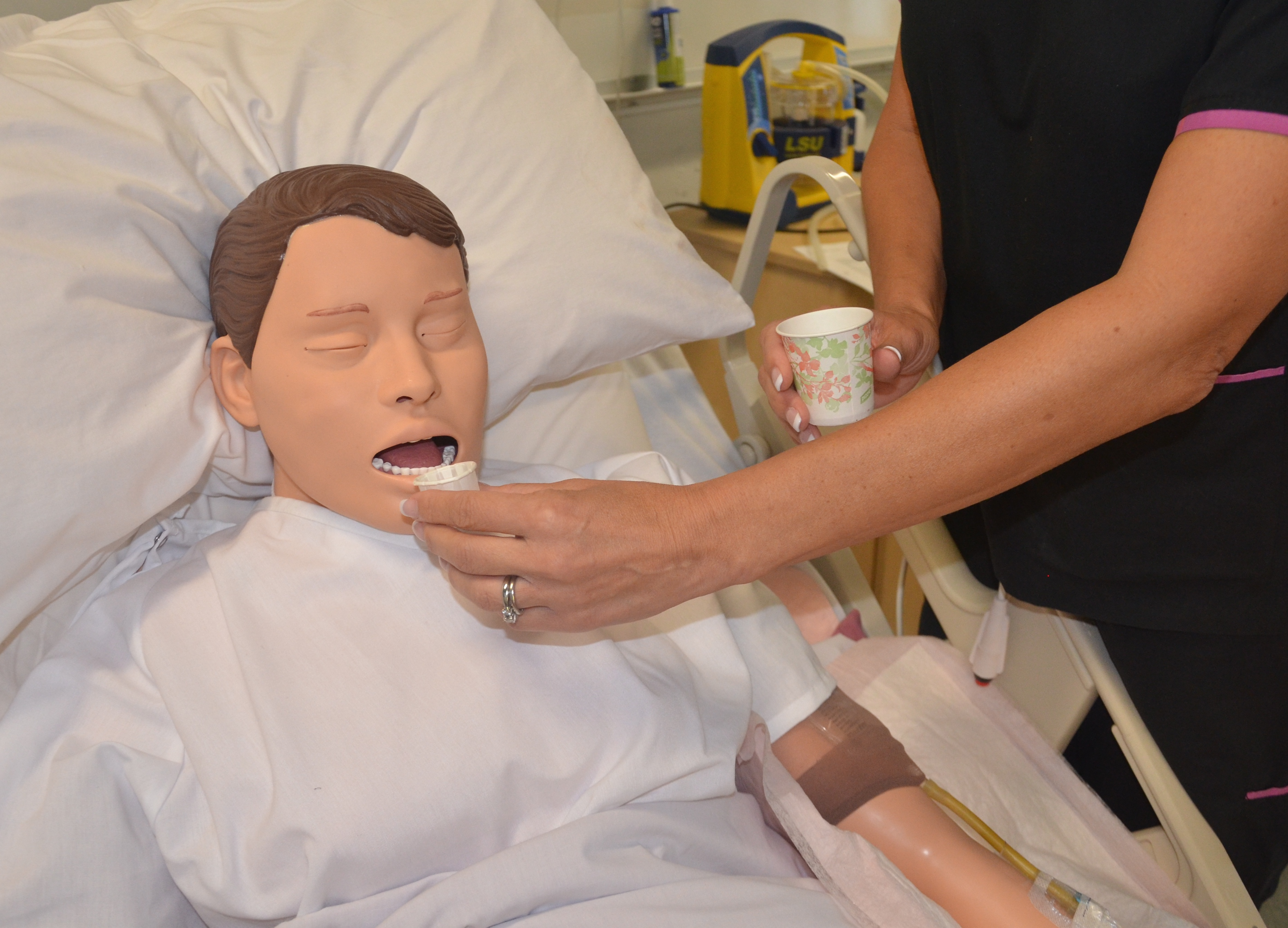
A health professional demonstrates how to offer oral medication, on a mannequin.

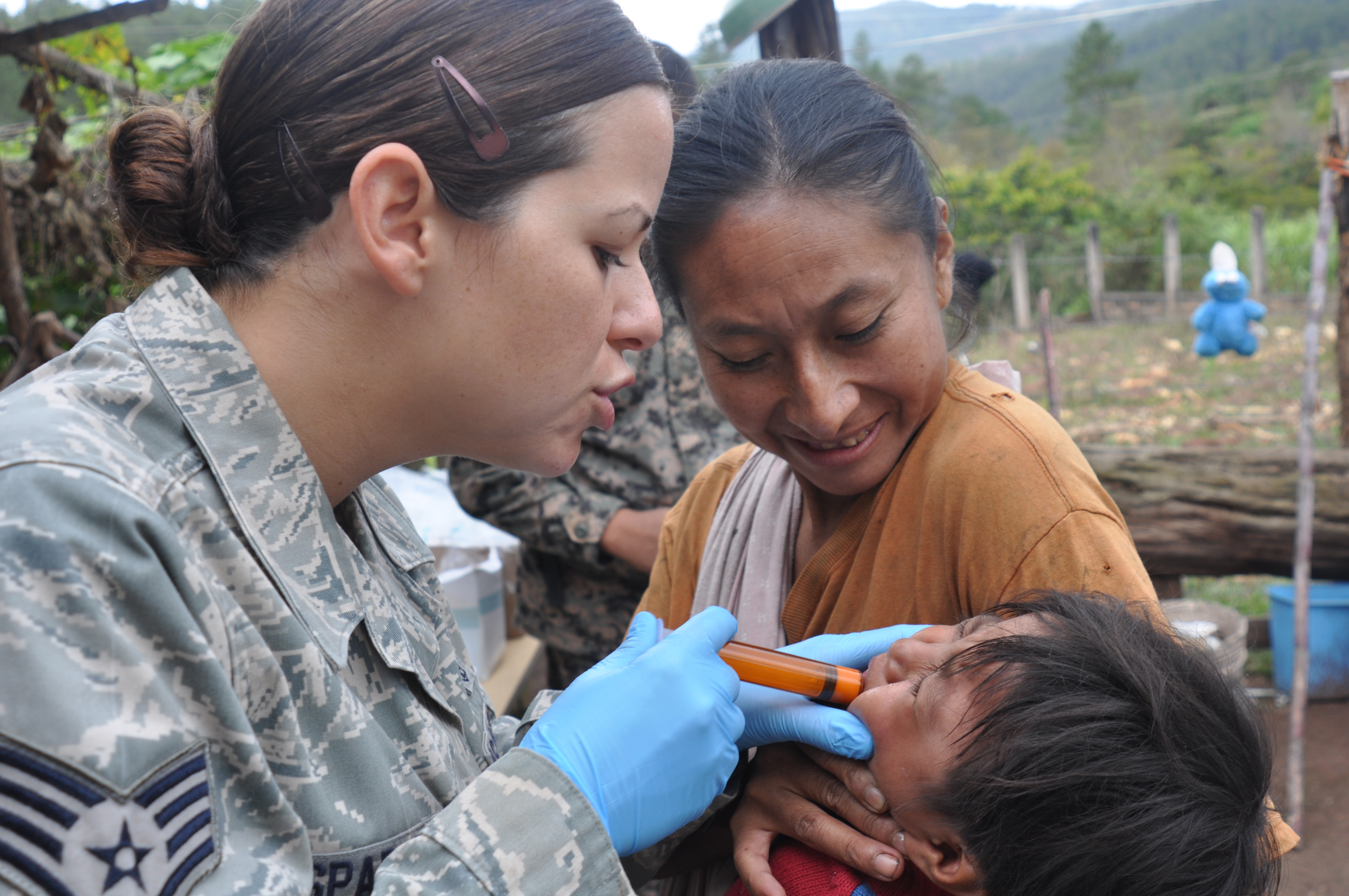
Oral administration of a liquid.

Oral administration is a route of administration whereby a substance is taken through the mouth, swallowed, and then processed via the digestive system. This is a common route of administration for many medications.

Oral administration can be easier and less painful than other routes of administration, such as injection. However, the onset of action is relatively slow, and the effectiveness is reduced if it is not absorbed properly in the digestive system, or if it is broken down by digestive enzymes before it can reach the bloodstream. Some medications may cause gastrointestinal side effects, such as nausea or vomiting, when taken orally. Oral administration can also only be applied to conscious patients, and patients able to swallow.

== Terminology ==
Per os (/ˌpɜːrˈoʊs/; P.O.) is an adverbial phrase meaning literally from Latin "through the mouth" or "by mouth". The expression is used in medicine to describe a treatment that is taken orally (but not used in the mouth such as, caries prophylaxis). The abbreviation P.O. is often used on medical prescriptions.

== Scope ==
Enteral administration includes:

- Buccal, dissolved inside the cheek
- Sublabial, dissolved under the lip
- Sublingual administration (SL), dissolved under the tongue, but due to rapid absorption many consider SL a parenteral route
- Oral (PO), swallowed tablet, capsule or liquid

Enteral medications come in various forms, including oral solid dosage (OSD) forms:

- Tablets to swallow, chew or dissolve in water or under the tongue
- Capsules and chewable capsules (with a coating that dissolves in the stomach or bowel to release the medication there)
- Time-release or sustained-release tablets and capsules (which release the medication gradually)
- Powders or granules and oral liquid dosage forms:
- Teas
- Drops
- Liquid medications or syrups

== Facilitating methods ==
Concomitant ingestion of water facilitates in swallowing tablets and capsules. If the substance has disagreeable taste, addition of a flavor may facilitate ingestion. Substances that are harmful to the teeth are preferably given through a straw.

== See also ==
- Nothing by mouth
- List of abbreviations used in medical prescriptions
- List of Latin phrases
- Medical prescription
- Thin-film drug delivery
