= Dosage form =

Any specific format for medications, specific to a dose and route

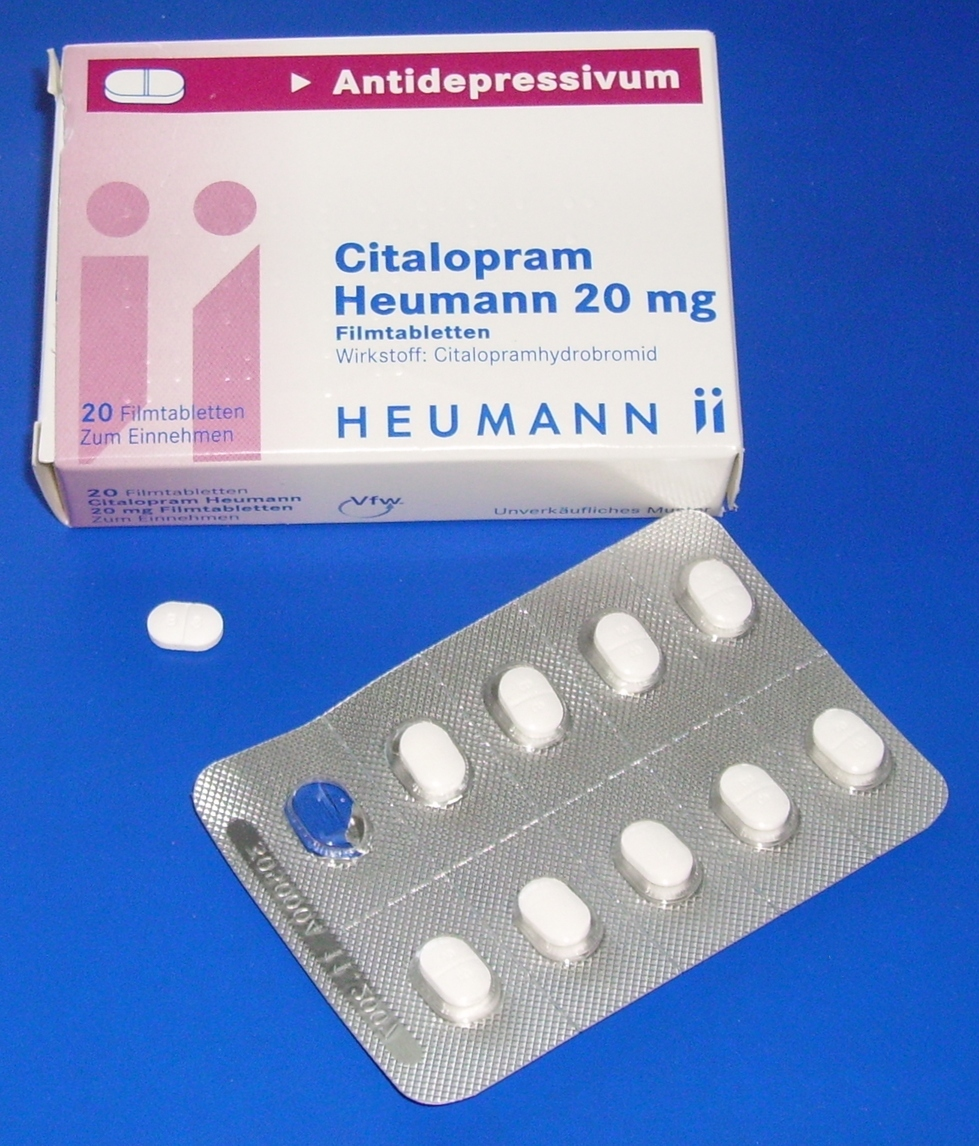
Tablets in a blister pack

Dosage forms (also called unit doses) are pharmaceutical drug products presented in a specific form for use. They contain a mixture of active ingredients and inactive components (excipients), configured in a particular way (such as a capsule shell) and apportioned into a specific dose. For example, two products may both be amoxicillin, but one may come in 500 mg capsules, while another may be in 250 mg chewable tablets.

The term unit dose can also refer to non-reusable packaging, particularly when each drug product is individually packaged. However, the FDA differentiates this by referring to it as unit-dose "packaging" or "dispensing". Depending on the context, multi(ple) unit dose may refer to multiple distinct drug products packaged together or a single product containing multiple drugs and/or doses.

== Formulations ==
The term dosage form may also sometimes refer only to the pharmaceutical formulation of a drug product's constituent substances, without considering its final configuration as a consumable product (e.g., capsule, patch, etc.). Due to the somewhat ambiguous nature and overlap of these terms within the pharmaceutical industry, caution is advisable when discussing them with others who may interpret the terminology differently.

== Types ==
Dosage forms vary depending on the method/route of administration, which can include many types of liquid, solid, and semisolid forms. Common dosage forms include tablets, capsules, drinks, solutions, suspensions, and syrups, among others.

A combination drug (or fixed-dose combination; FDC) is a product that contains more than one active ingredient (e.g., one tablet, one capsule, or one syrup with multiple drugs).

In naturopathy, dosages can take the form of decoctions and herbal teas, in addition to the more conventional methods mentioned above.

== Route of administration ==
The route of administration (ROA) for drug delivery depends on the dosage form of the substance. Different dosage forms may be available for a particular drug, especially if certain conditions restrict the ROA. For example, if a patient is unconscious or experiencing persistent nausea and vomiting, oral administration may not be feasible, necessitating the use of alternative routes, such as inhalational, buccal, sublingual, nasal, suppository, or parenteral.

A specific dosage form may also be required due to issues such as chemical stability or pharmacokinetic properties. For instance, insulin cannot be given orally because it is extensively metabolized in the gastrointestinal tract (GIT) before it reaches the bloodstream, preventing it from reaching therapeutic target destinations. Similarly, the oral and intravenous doses of a drug like paracetamol differ for the same reason.

=== Oral ===
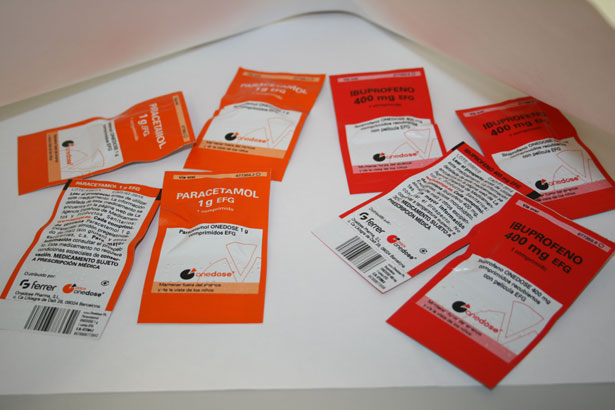
Single unit packets with full identification (text and bar codes)

- Pills, i.e. tablets or capsules
- Liquids such as syrups, solutions, elixers, emulsions, and tinctures
- Liquids such as decoctions and herbal teas
- Orally disintegrating tablets
- Lozenges or candy (electuaries)
- Thin films (e.g., Listerine Pocketpaks, nitroglycerin) to be placed on top of or underneath the tongue as well as against the cheek
- Powders or effervescent powder or tablets, often instructed to be mixed into a food item
- Plants or seeds prepared in various ways such as a cannabis edible
- Pastes such as high fluoride toothpastes
- Gases such as oxygen (can also be delivered through the nose)

=== Ophthalmic ===
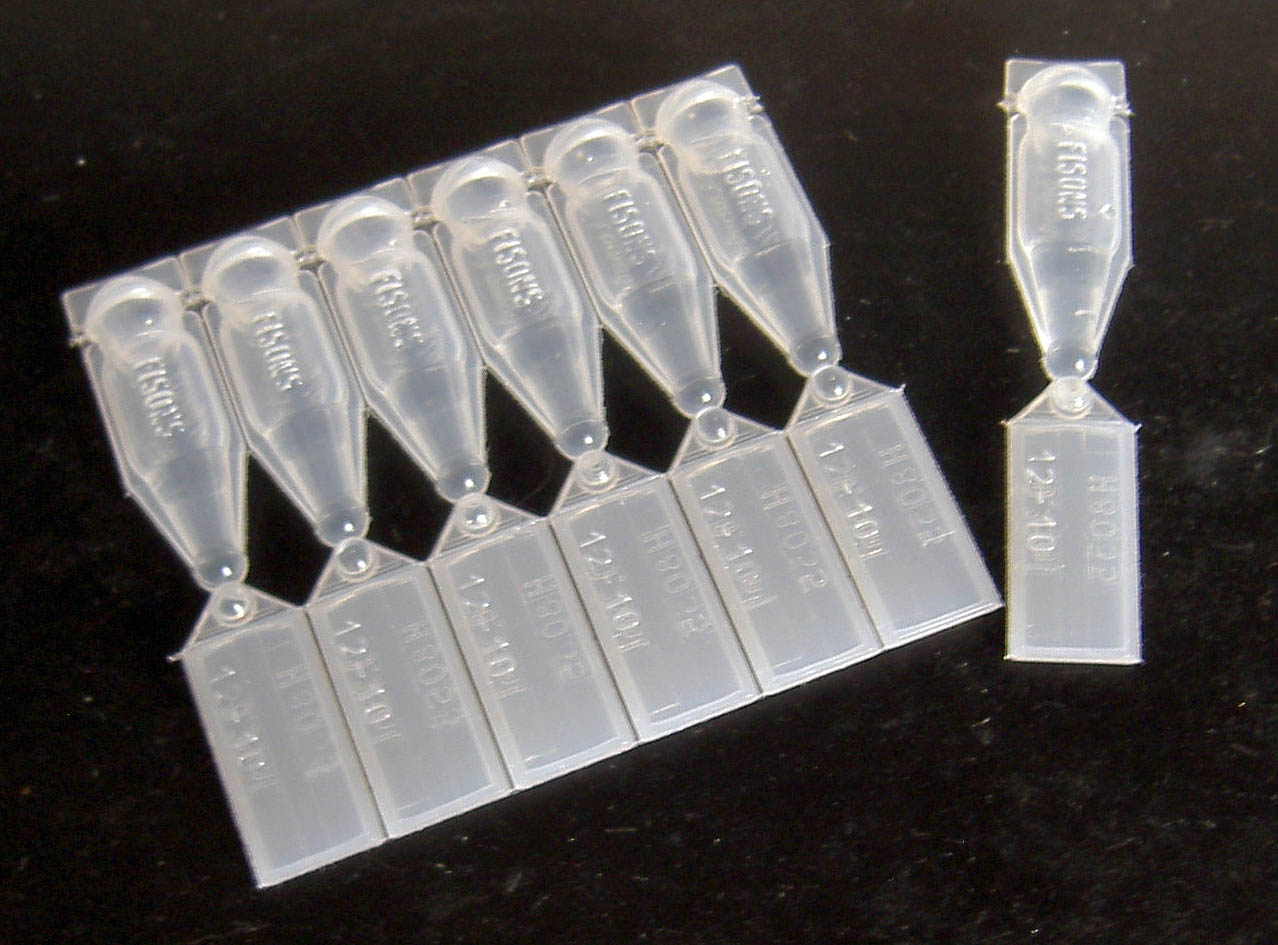
Vials of eye drops for single use

- Eye drops
- Lotions
- Ointments
- Emulsions

=== Inhalation ===
- Aerosolized medication
- Dry-powder Inhalers or metered dose inhalers
- Nebulizer-administered medication
- Smoking
- Vaporizer-administered medication

==== Unintended ingredients ====
Talc is an excipient often used in pharmaceutical tablets that may end up being crushed to a powder against medical advice or for recreational use. Also, illicit drugs that occur as white powder in their pure form are often cut with cheap talc. Natural talc is cheap but contains asbestos while asbestos-free talc is more expensive. Inhaled talc that has asbestos is generally accepted as being able to cause lung cancer if it is inhaled. The evidence about asbestos-free talc is less clear, according to the American Cancer Society.

=== Injection ===
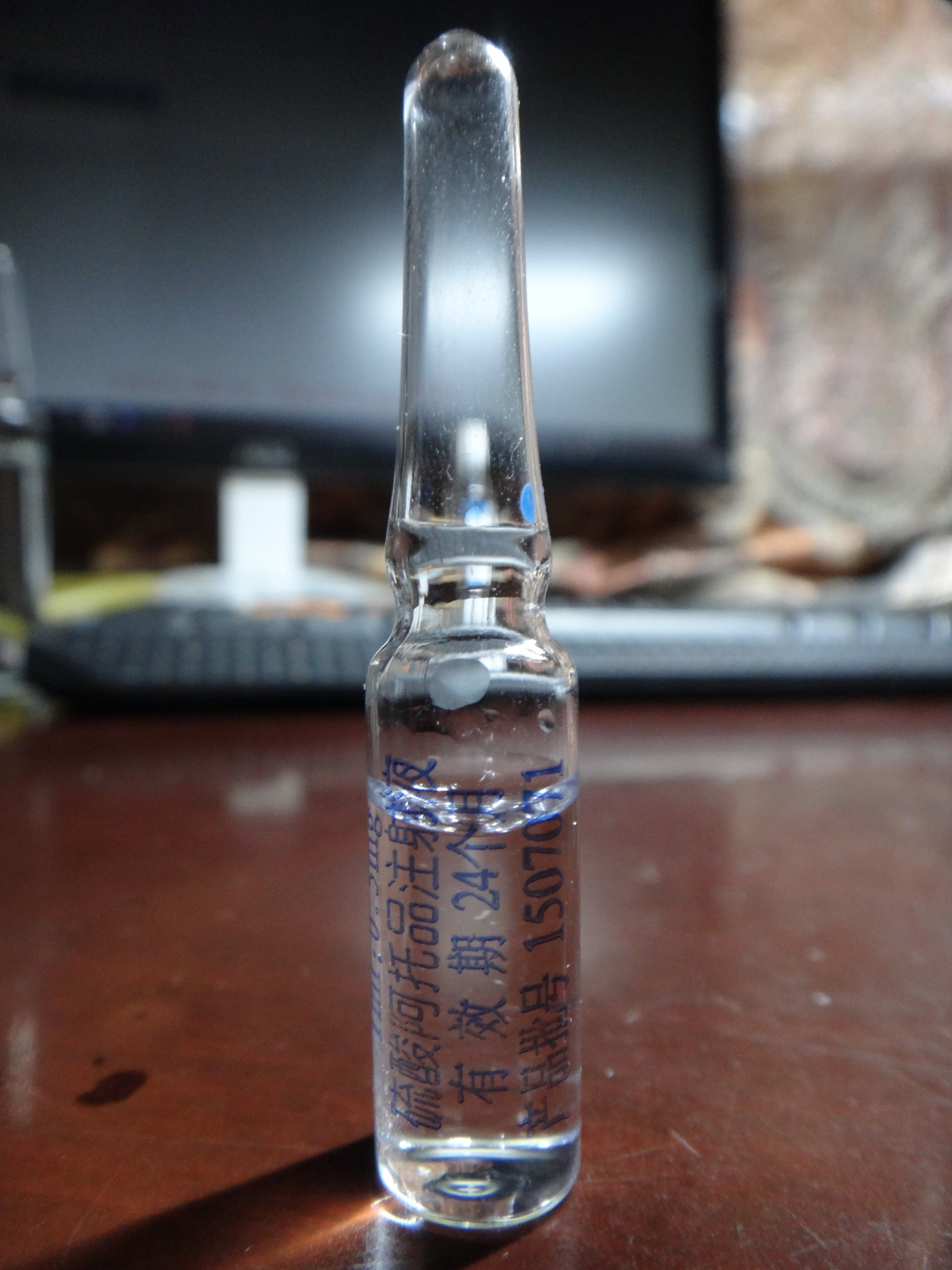
An ampoule containing atropine injection 1mL/0.5mg

==== Parenteral ====
- Intradermally-administered (ID)
- Subcutaneously-administered (SC)
- Intramuscularly-administered (IM)
- Intraosseous administration (IO)
- Intraperitoneally-administered (IP)
- intravenously-administered (IV)
- Intracavernously-administered (ICI)

These are usually solutions and suspensions.

==== Unintended ingredients ====
===== Safe =====
Eye drops (normal saline in disposable packages) are distributed to syringe users by needle exchange programs.

===== Unsafe =====
The injection of talc from crushed pills has been associated with pulmonary talcosis in intravenous drug users.

=== Topical ===
- Creams, liniments, balms (such as lip balm or antiperspirants and deodorants), lotions, or ointments, etc.
- Gels and hydrogels
- Ear drops
- Transdermal and dermal patches to be applied to the skin
- Powders

==== Unintended use ====
- It is not safe to calculate divided doses by cutting and weighing medical skin patches, because there's no guarantee that the substance is evenly distributed on the patch surface. For example, fentanyl transdermal patches are designed to slowly release the substance over 3 days. It is well known that cut fentanyl transdermal consumed orally have cause overdoses and deaths.
- Single blotting papers for illicit drugs injected from solvents in syringes may also cause uneven distribution across the surface.

=== Other ===
- Intravaginal administration
  - Vaginal rings
  - Capsules and tablets
  - Suppositories
- Rectal administration (enteral)
  - Suppositories
  - Suspensions and solutions in the form of enemas
  - Gels
- Urethral
- Nasal sprays

== See also ==
- Classification of Pharmaco-Therapeutic Referrals
- Drug delivery
- Route of administration
- Pharmaceutical packaging
