= Richard H. Roberts =

American pharmaceutical executive (born 1957)

- Born: 1957 (age 68–69); Philadelphia
- Education: M.D. and Ph.D. University of Pennsylvania
- Occupations: Businessman; Philanthropist
- Known for: CEO and chairman of URL Pharma
- Political party: Republican
- Children: 6

Richard H. Roberts (born 1957) is an American former pharmaceutical executive, philanthropist, and Republican donor.

== Biography ==
Born in a secular Jewish family Philadelphia in 1957 and raised in Abington Township, Pennsylvania, the son of Albert Roberts. His father, a chemist, started URL Pharma in 1946 which manufactured steroidal hormones that treated pain by collecting pig pituitary glands from slaughterhouses. Roberts earned a M.D. and a Ph.D. from the University of Pennsylvania. After school, he took over his father's money-losing pharmaceutical company. In 1997, he sold majority control of the firm to several venture capital firms which left him as the CEO of the company with a ~30% ownership interest.

In 2009, the FDA approved colchicine as a monotherapy for the treatment of three different indications (familial Mediterranean fever, acute gout flares, and for the prophylaxis of gout flares) and gave URL Pharma a three-year marketing exclusivity agreement in exchange for URL Pharma doing 17 new studies and investing $100 million into the product (of which $45 million went to the FDA for the application fee). URL Pharma subsequently raised the price from $0.09 per tablet to $4.85; and in October 2010, the FDA removed the older unapproved colchicine (in both in oral and intravenous forms) from the market (although they allowed pharmacies the opportunity to buy up the older unapproved colchicine). Roberts indicated that the price increase mirrored other approved and branded drugs that were used to treat gout pain. URL Pharma returned to profitability with its gout treatment branded Colcrys consisting of 72% of the companies $600 million in sales in 2011. Roberts sold URL Pharma for $800 million in June 2012 to Takeda Pharmaceuticals of Japan.

== Political activism ==
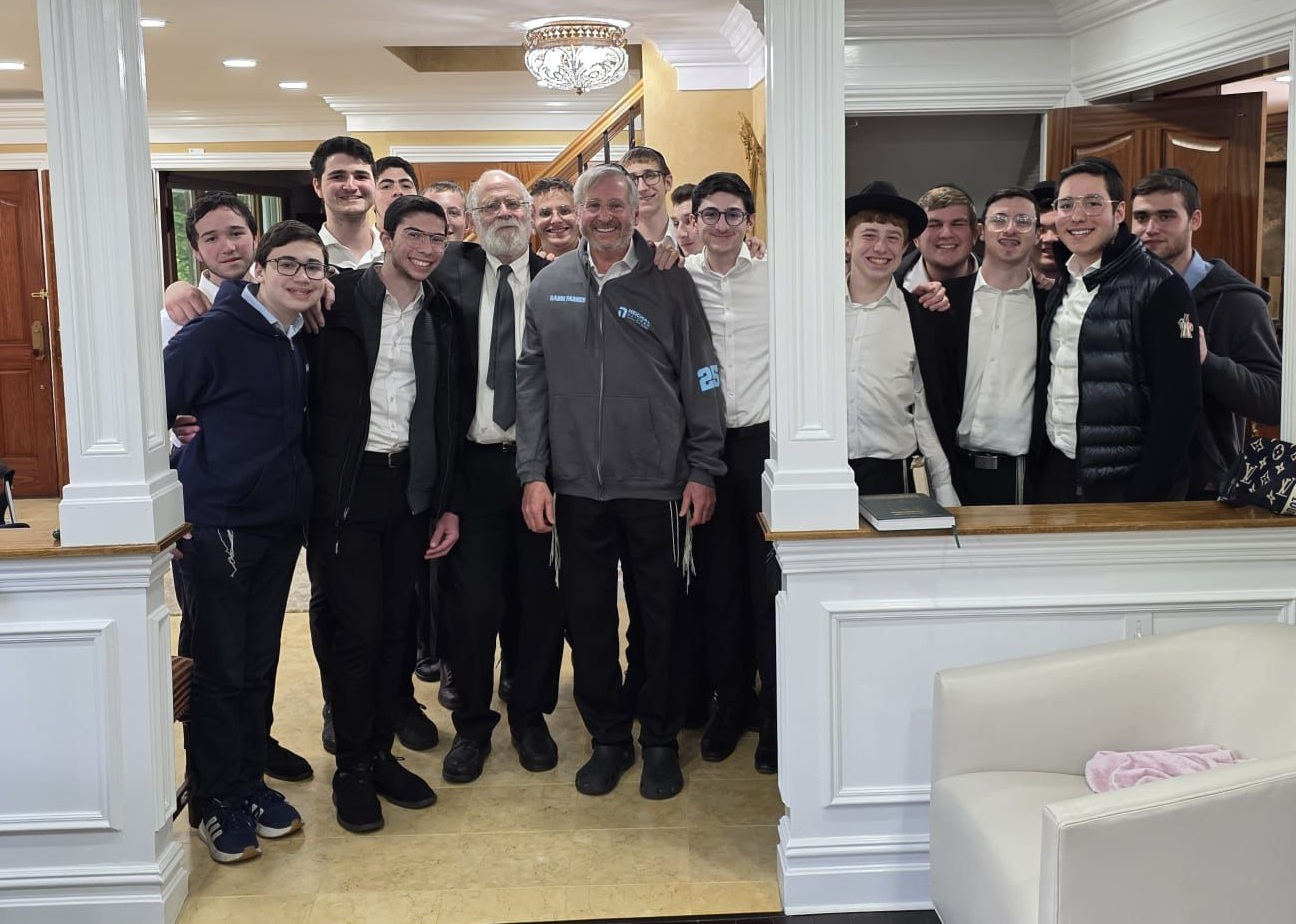
Richard Roberts with Rabbi Parnes' 12th grade Heichal HaTorah class, circa 2026

Roberts is a top donor to Republican politicians including Senator Lindsey Graham of South Carolina, Governor Scott Walker of Wisconsin, and Rand Paul. He has described himself as a "die-hard Republican". In 2010, he gave $750,000 to the campaign of Mitt Romney. In 2012, Roberts contributed $1 million to a super PAC that supported U.S. Representative Allen West.

A pro-Israel donor, Roberts served at the Israel Advisory Committee of Donald Trump's 2016 presidential campaign. He sponsored Paul's 2013 trip to Israel, which he said helped him "refine some of his positions" on the country. Paul had previously stated that the United States should stop aiding all foreign countries, including Israel.

== Personal life ==
Roberts is married with six children and lives in Lakewood, New Jersey. He is one of the largest philanthropists to the Orthodox Jewish community in Lakewood.
