= Fairmount Township, New Jersey =

Short lived settlement in New Jersey, US

Coordinates: 40.798°N 74.285°W

Fairmount was a township that existed in Essex County, New Jersey, United States, from 1862 to 1863.

Fairmount was incorporated as a township by an Act of the New Jersey Legislature on March 11, 1862, from portions of Caldwell Township (now Fairfield Township), Livingston Township and Orange Township.

Fairmount lasted until April 10, 1863, shortly after its first anniversary, when it was absorbed into the newly created West Orange Township.
