= Van Ness House (Fairfield, New Jersey) =

Historic house in New Jersey, United States

- U.S. National Register of Historic Places
- New Jersey Register of Historic Places
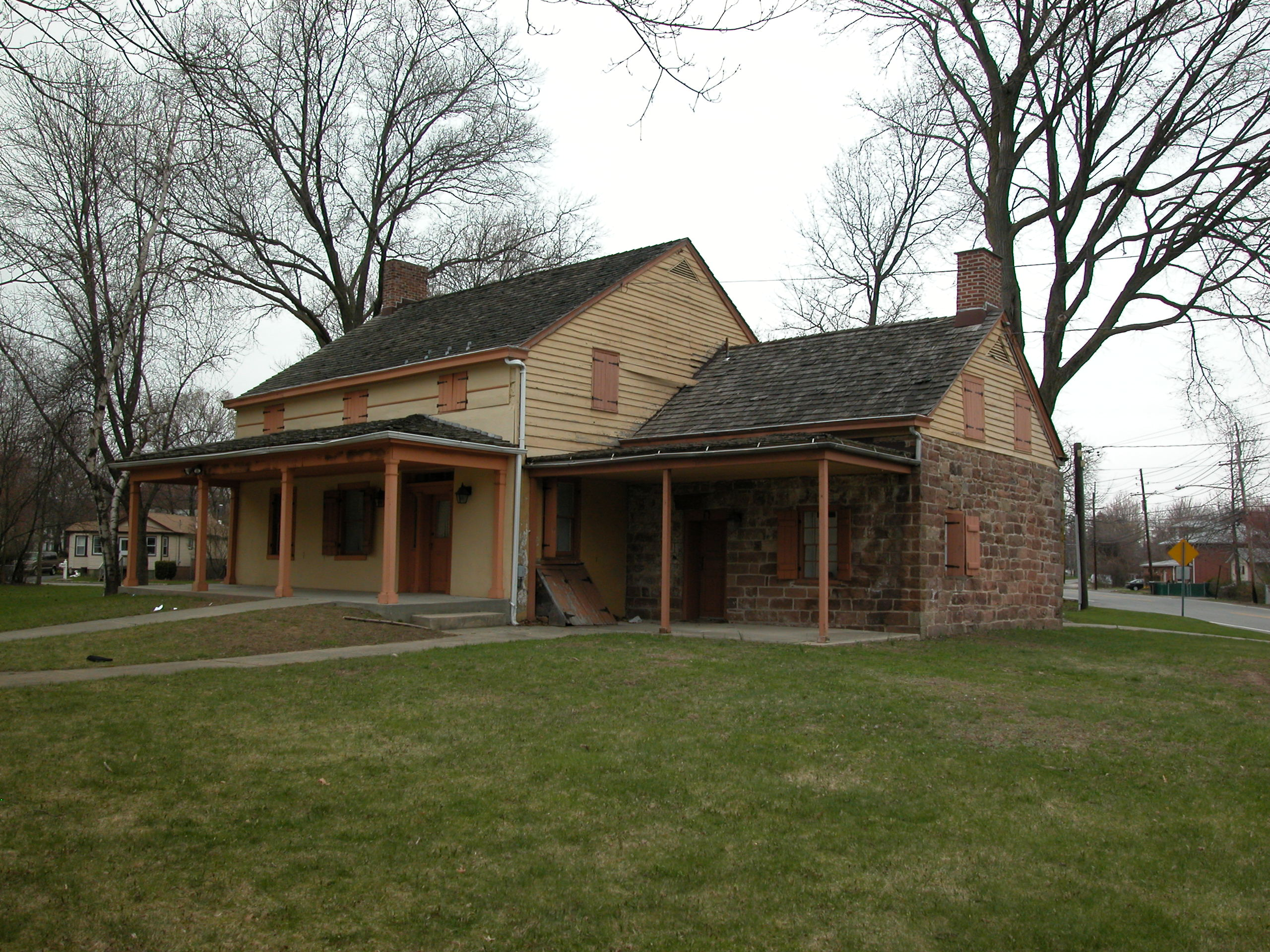

- Location within Essex County, New Jersey Location within New Jersey Location within the United States
- Location: 236 Little Falls Road, Fairfield, New Jersey
- Coordinates: 40°52′59″N 74°15′35″W
- Area: 0.1 acres (0.040 ha)
- Built: November 5, 1740
- NRHP reference No.: 77000862
- NJRHP No.: 1086

Significant dates
- Added to NRHP: July 29, 1977
- Designated NJRHP: August 10, 1976

The Van Ness House, also known as the Peter Van Ness Farmhouse, is located at 236 Little Falls Road in the township of Fairfield in Essex County, New Jersey. The house was built about 1740. It was documented by the Historic American Buildings Survey in 1939. It was added to the National Register of Historic Places on July 29, 1977, for its significance in agriculture and architecture.

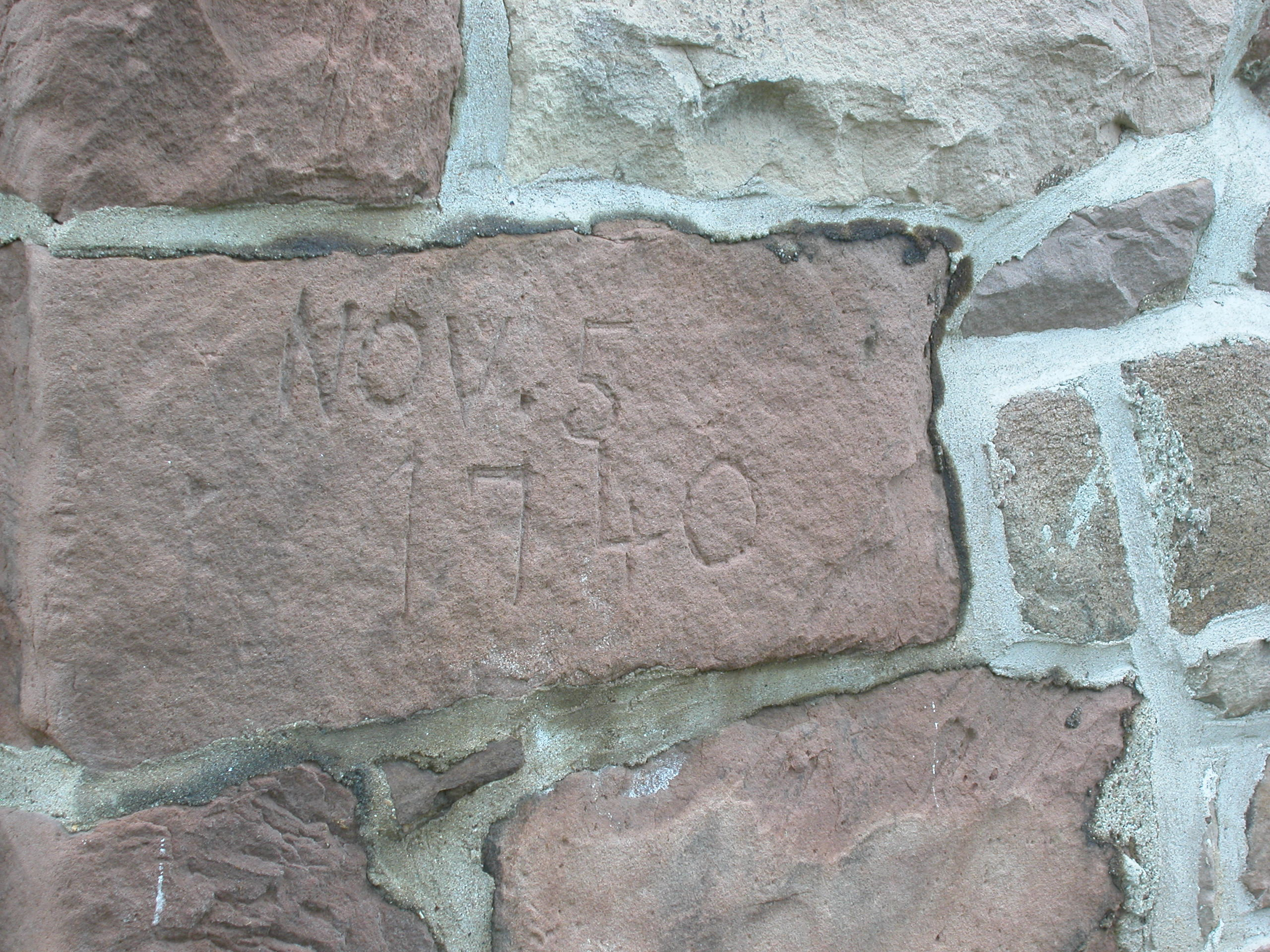
The cornerstone shows the date the house was completed, November 5, 1740

== Van Ness family history ==
Nine Dutch settlers (Simon Van Ness, Gerebrand Clawson, Hans Spier, Elias Franson, Christopher Steinmets, Andrese Louwrentz, Garret Vanderhoof, Hessell Pieters and Jan Spier) purchased a substantial part of the Horseneck Tract from the Lenape Native Americans in 1701. Later surveys confirmed that Simon Van Ness owned 300 acres of the north-east boundary. When the Board of East Jersey Proprietors began to press settlers to secure Proprietary deeds, Simon produced proof of 'fee simple' purchase from The West Jersey Society a London based land investment partnership. Simon received a confirmation deed on September 3, 1744. After his death, Simon's properties were divided among his four sons and two sons-in-law. His son Isaac was given a substantial portion of the 300 acres in Fairfield including the homestead there. Isaac's son Peter was named executor of the will of Isaac Reyken (Ryker) on September 30, 1768. Peter Van Ness then became the first registered owner of the Van Ness House, along the Passaic River where it can still be found today.

== Changes to the house ==
The house went through some renovation in the 1840s, 1930s, and 1980's.

== See also ==
- National Register of Historic Places listings in Essex County, New Jersey
