= Bradley Pharmaceuticals =

American pharmaceutical company

Bradley Pharmaceuticals, Inc.
- Company type: Merged
- Industry: Pharmaceuticals
- Founded: 1985; 41 years ago
- Fate: closed February 21, 2008
- Successor: Nycomed
- Headquarters: Fairfield Township, Essex County, New Jersey
- Key people: Daniel Glassman (CEO)
- Products: Adoxa, Zoderm, Pamine Forte, Kerol
- Revenue: US$145 million (2006)
- Number of employees: 300 (as of December 31, 2006)

Bradley Pharmaceuticals was a pharmaceutical company headquartered in Fairfield Township, Essex County, New Jersey. The company was founded in 1985 by Daniel Glassman who was also its CEO.

The company marketed to niche physician specialties in the U.S. and 38 international markets. Bradley Pharmaceuticals comprised Doak Dermatologics, specialized in therapies for dermatology and podiatry; Kenwood Therapeutics, providing gastroenterology, OB/GYN and other internal medicine brands; and A. Aarons, which markets authorized generic versions of Doak and Kenwood therapies.

== Doak Dermatologics ==
Doak Dermatologics was the division of Bradley Pharmaceuticals, that marketed products to dermatologists. Its flag products were Zoderm which is a topical anti-acne product. Adoxa (doxycycline) was an antibiotic intended to treat mild to severe acne.

== Kenwood Therapeutics ==
Kenwood was the affiliate brand that worked with therapeutic products. Among the most prescribed ones were Entsol which is a respiratory therapeutic product and Pamine which is intended to treat digestive problems.

== Public trading ==
The company was publicly traded at the NYSE by its code BDY, since May 2003.

== Nycomed Merger ==
Bradley Pharmaceuticals merged with Nycomed, a European company. The merger was completed on February 21, 2008, and Bradley became an integral part of Nycomed.
