= TachoSil =

Collagen sponge used in surgery

Combination of
- Fibrinogen: Glycoprotein
- Thrombin: Coagulation factor

Clinical data
- Trade names: Tachosil
- AHFS/Drugs.com: Professional Drug Facts
- License data: US DailyMed: Tachosil
- Routes of administration: Epilesional
- ATC code: B02BC30 (WHO)

Legal status
- Legal status: UK: POM (Prescription only); US: ℞-only; EU: Rx-only

Identifiers
- KEGG: D12591

Tachosil is an equine collagen sponge coated with the human plasma-derived coagulation factors fibrinogen and thrombin. It is used during surgery to stop local bleeding on internal organs (hemostasis). TachoSil reacts upon contact with blood, other body fluids or saline to form a clot that glues it to the tissue surface.

Tachosil may cause an allergic reaction, thrombosis (blood clots), a blockage in the intestine when used during abdominal surgeries, the formation of scar tissue and foreign body granuloma (a type of inflammatory reaction).

== Medical uses ==
Tachosil is indicated in for supportive treatment in surgery for improvement of haemostasis, to promote tissue sealing and for suture support in vascular surgery where standard techniques are insufficient. According to studies comparing Tachosil to argon beamer or stitching in patients undergoing liver surgery, Tachosil was associated with significantly lower time until the bleeding stopped. Tachosil is indicated in adults for supportive sealing of the dura mater to prevent postoperative cerebrospinal leakage following neurological surgery.
