= Thin-film drug delivery =

Drug delivery method

Thin-film drug delivery uses a dissolving film or oral drug strip to administer drugs via absorption in the mouth (buccally or sublingually) and/or via the small intestines (enterically). A film is prepared using hydrophilic polymers that rapidly dissolves on the tongue or buccal cavity, delivering the drug to the systemic circulation via dissolution when contact with liquid is made.

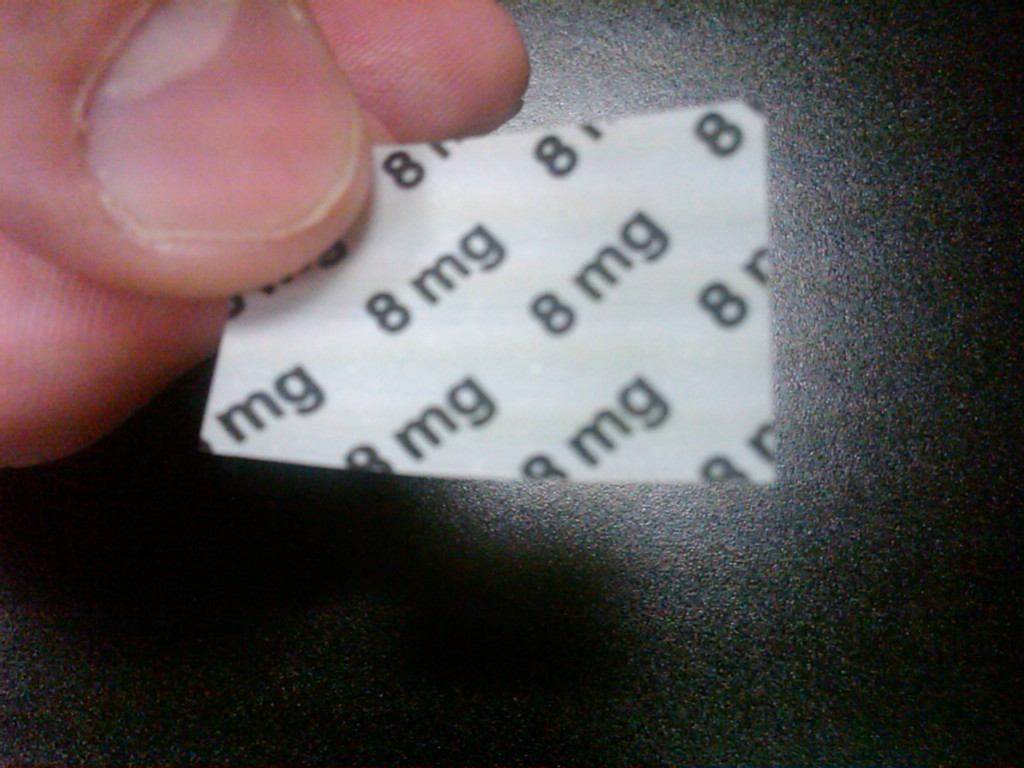
Zuplenz 8 mg (approved by FDA, July 7, 2010). Photo courtesy of Aquestive Therapeutics (formerly MonoSol Rx).

Thin-film drug delivery has emerged as an advanced alternative to the traditional tablets, capsules and liquids often associated with prescription and OTC medications. Similar in size, shape and thickness to a postage stamp, thin-film strips are typically designed for oral administration, with the user placing the strip on or under the tongue (sublingual) or along the inside of the cheek (buccal). These drug delivery options allow the medication to bypass the first pass metabolism thereby making the medication more bioavailable. As the strip dissolves, the drug can enter the blood stream enterically, buccally or sublingually. Evaluating the systemic transmucosal drug delivery, the buccal mucosa is the preferred region as compared to the sublingual mucosa. Oral Thin Films (Oral Dissolvable Strips) address several of the disadvantages of tablets or capsules such as dysphagia or the inability to adjust dosing to patient parameters, often resulting to a lack of treatment adherence, especially in low-resource settings.

Different buccal delivery products have been marketed or are proposed for certain diseases like trigeminal neuralgia, Ménière's disease, diabetes, and addiction. There are many commercial non-drug product to use thin films like Mr. Mint and Listerine PocketPaks breath freshening strips. Since then, thin-film products for other breath fresheners, as well as a number of cold, flu, anti-snoring and gastrointestinal medications, have entered the marketplace. There are currently several projects in development that will deliver prescription drugs using the thin-film dosage form.

Formulation of oral drug strips involves the application of both aesthetic and performance characteristics such as strip-forming polymers, plasticizers, active pharmaceutical ingredient, sweetening agents, saliva stimulating agent, flavoring agents, coloring agents, stabilizing and thickening agents. From the regulatory perspectives, all excipients used in the formulation of oral drug strips should be approved for use in oral pharmaceutical dosage forms.

== Oral drug strip development ==
=== Strip forming polymers ===
The polymer employed should be non-toxic, non-irritant and devoid of leachable impurities. It should have good wetting and spreadability property. The polymer should exhibit sufficient peel, shear and tensile strengths. The polymer should be readily available and should not be very expensive. Film obtained should be tough enough so that there won't be any damage while handling or during transportation. Combination of microcrystalline cellulose and maltodextrin has been used to formulate Oral Strips of piroxicam made by hot melt extrusion technique. Pullulan has been the most widely used film former (used in Listerine PocketPak, Benadryl, etc.)

=== Plasticizers ===
Plasticizer is a vital ingredient of the OS formulation. It helps to improve the flexibility and reduces the brittleness of the strip. Plasticizer significantly improves the strip properties by reducing the glass transition temperature of the polymer. Glycerol, Propylene glycol, low molecular weight polyethylene glycols, phthalate derivatives like dimethyl, diethyl and dibutyl phthalate, Citrate derivatives such as tributyl, triethyl, acetyl citrate, triacetin and castor oil are some of the commonly used plasticizer excipients.

=== Active pharmaceutical ingredient ===
Since the size of the dosage form has limitation, high-dose molecules are difficult to be incorporated in OS. Generally 5%w/w to 30%w/w of active pharmaceutical ingredients can be incorporated in the oral strip.

=== Sweetening, flavoring and coloring agents ===
An important aspect of thin film drug technology is its taste and color. The sweet taste in formulation is more important in case of pediatric population. Natural sweeteners as well as artificial sweeteners are used to improve the flavor of the mouth dissolving formulations for the flavors changes from individual to individual. Pigments such as titanium dioxide is incorporated for coloring.

=== Stabilizing and thickening agents ===
The stabilizing and thickening agents are employed to improve the viscosity and consistency of dispersion or solution of the strip preparation solution or suspension before casting. Drug content uniformity is a requirement for all dosage forms, particularly those containing low dose highly potent drugs. To uniquely meet this requirement, thin film formulations contain uniform dispersions of drug throughout the whole manufacturing process. Since this criterion is essential for the quality of the thin film and final pharmaceutical dosage form, the use of Laser Scanning Confocal Microscopy (LSCM) was recommended to follow the manufacturing process.

=== Oral strips in development ===
An increasing number of film-based therapeutics are in development, including:

- Sildenafil citrate indicated for the treatment of erectile disfunction (ED), is being developed for use by Cure Pharmaceutical.
- Montelukast indicated for the treatment of dementia, asthma and allergy, is being developed variously for uses as a film by IntelGenx and Aquestive Therapeutics (formerly known as Monosol Rx).
- Midatech, a company specializing in nanotechnology, is partnering with Aquestive Therapeutics to create a film-based insulin. (Sachs Associates. 5th Annual European Life Science CEP Forum for Partnering and Investing. March 6–7, 2012. Zurich, Switzerland.)
- Rizatriptan indicated for the treatment of migraine, is being developed for use as a film by IntelGenx, Aquestive Therapeutics, and Zim Laboratories Ltd.
- Aquestive Therapeutics is also developing a testosterone film-based therapeutic for the treatment of male hypogonadism. The product is currently in phase 1.
- Undergraduate biomedical engineering students at Johns Hopkins University have created a new drug delivery system based on the thin-film technology used by a breath freshener. Laced with a vaccine against rotavirus, the strips could be used to provide the vaccine to infants in impoverished areas.
- Other molecules like sildenafil citrate, tadalafil, methylcobalamin and vitamin D_{3} are also developed by IntelGenx Zim Laboratories Ltd.
- Oak Therapeutics, a drug delivery company, has developed an oral thin film (oral disposable strip) for the treatment of Xerostomia, and has isoniazid-rifapentine (for the treatment of latent tuberculosis) and abacavir-lumevadine-dolutegravir (ALD, for the treatment of HIV/AIDS) oral dissolvable strips in development, funded by grants from the National Institutes of Health (NIH).
