= List of largest mergers and acquisitions =

The following tables list the largest mergers and acquisitions by decade of transaction. Transaction values are given in the US dollar value for the year of the merger, adjusted for inflation. As of February 2026, the largest ever acquisition was the 2026 takeover of xAI by SpaceX at $250 billion ($250 billion adjusted for inflation). AT&T appears in these lists the most times with six entries, for a combined transaction value of $334.4 billion. Mergers and acquisitions are notated with the year the transaction was initiated, not necessarily completed. Mergers are shown as the market value of the combined entities.

== Free market enterprises ==
=== 1870s ===
Top 2 M&A deals worldwide by value from 1870 to 1879:

Rank	Year	Purchaser	Purchased	Transaction value (in billions USD)	Inflation adjusted (in billions USD)
1	1874	(United States) Honeybrook Coal Company	(United States) Wilkesbarre Coal and Iron Company	0.01	0.285
2	1879	(United States) Pacific Coast Oil Company	(United States) Star Oil	0.001	0.035

=== 1880s ===
Top 2 M&A deals worldwide by value from 1880 to 1889:

Rank	Year	Purchaser	Purchased	Transaction value (in billions USD)	Inflation adjusted (in billions USD)
1	1884	(United States) New York Gas Light Company	(United States) Manhattan Gas Light Company (United States) Metropolitan Gas Light Company (United States) Municipal Gas Light Company (United States) Knickerbocker Gas Light Company (United States) Harlem Gas Light Company	0.045	1.6
2	1883	(United States) Buffalo, Pittsburgh and Western Railroad	(United States) Buffalo, New York and Philadelphia Railway (United States) Olean and Salamanca Railroad (United States) Oil City and Chicago Railroad Company	0.02085	0.72

=== 1890s ===
Top 2 M&A deals worldwide by value from 1890 to 1899:

Rank	Year	Purchaser	Purchased	Transaction value (in billions USD)	Inflation adjusted (in billions USD)
1	1899	(United States) American Spirits Manufacturing Company	(United States) Kentucky Distilleries and Warehouse Company (United States) Spirits Distributing Company	0.125	4.8
2	1899	(United States) Pullman Palace Car Company	(United States) Wagner Palace Car Company	0.074	2.9

=== 1900s ===
Top 3 M&A deals worldwide by value from 1900 to 1909:

Rank	Year	Purchaser	Purchased	Transaction value (in billions USD)	Inflation adjusted (in billions USD)
1	1901	(United States) Carnegie Steel Company	(United States) Federal Steel Company (United States) National Steel Company	0.492	19
2	1907	(United States) New York, New Haven and Hartford Railroad Company	(United States) Boston and Maine Corporation	0.310	10.7
3	1909	(United States) Interborough Rapid Transit Company	(United States) Metropolitan Street Railway	0.222	8

=== 1910s ===
Top 3 M&A deals worldwide by value from 1910 to 1919:

Rank	Year	Purchaser	Purchased	Transaction value (in billions USD)	Inflation adjusted (in billions USD)
1	1915	(United States) Midvale Steel Company	(United States) Remington Arms Company (United States) Worth Brothers Company	0.100	3.2
2	1915	(United States) United Dry Goods	(United States) Associated Merchants Company	0.050	1.6
3	1918	(United States) General Motors	(United States) United Motors Company	0.045	0.963

=== 1920s ===
Top 5 M&A deals worldwide by value from 1920 to 1929:

Rank	Year	Purchaser	Purchased	Transaction value (in billions USD)	Inflation adjusted (in billions USD)
1	1928	(United States) Consolidated Gas Company of New York	(United States) Brooklyn Edison Company	1.0	18.8
2	1929	(United States) Niagara and Eastern Power Corporation	(United States) MohawkHudson Power Corporation (United States) Northeastern Power Corporation	0.665	12.5
3	1928	(United States) United Light and Power Company	(United States) American Light and Traction	0.522	9.8
4	1928	(United States) Hodenpyl & Hardy	(United States) Stevens & Wood	0.500	9.4
5	1928	(United States) Middle West Utilities	(United States) National Electric Power (United States) National Public Service (United States) New England Public Service (United States) Inland Power and Light	0.400	7.5

=== 1930s ===
Top 5 M&A deals worldwide by value from 1930 to 1939:

Rank	Year	Purchaser	Purchased	Transaction value (in billions USD)	Inflation adjusted (in billions USD)
1	1930	(United States) Pacific Gas and Electric Company	(United States) Great Western Power Company (United States) San Joaquin Light and Power Corporation (United States) Midland Counties Public Service Corporation	0.650	12.5
2	1932	(United States) Sinclair Consolidated Oil Corporation	(United States) Prairie Oil and Gas (United States) Prairie Pipe Line Company	0.542	12.8
3	1934	(United States) Republic Steel	(United States) Corrigan-McKinney Steel Corporation	0.323	7.8
4	1931	(United States) Bethlehem Steel	(United States) Pittsburgh Steel Company	0.080	1.7
5	1932	(United States) Studebaker Corporation	(United States) White Motor Company	0.026	0.614

=== 1940s ===
Top 5 M&A deals worldwide by value from 1940 to 1949:

Rank	Year	Purchaser	Purchased	Transaction value (in billions USD)	Inflation adjusted (in billions USD)
1	1945	(United States) Consolidated Edison	(United States) Brooklyn Edison Company (United States) New York and Queens Light and Power Company	1.2	21.5
2	1948	(United States) Central New York Power Corporation	(United States) New York Power and Light Corporation (United States) Buffalo Niagara Electric Corporation	0.500	6.7
3	1945	(United States) Pittsburgh Coal Company	(United States) Consolidation Coal Company	0.160	2.9
4	1948	(United States) Long Island Lighting Company	(United States) Queens Borough Gas and Electric Company (United States) Nassau & Suffolk Lighting Company	0.140	1.9
5	1941	(United States) Celanese Corporation	(United States) Celluoid Corporation	0.096	2.1

=== 1950s ===
Top 10 M&A deals worldwide by value from 1950 to 1959:

Rank	Year	Purchaser	Purchased	Transaction value (in billions USD)	Inflation adjusted (in billions USD)
1	1959	(United States) General Telephone	(United States) Sylvania Electric Products	1.8	19.9
2	1957	(United States) Armco	(United States) National Supply Company	0.768	8.8
3	1957	(United States) American Can Company	(United States) Marathon Corporation	0.717	8.2
4	1955	(United States) Monsanto	(United States) Lion Oil	0.550	6.6
5	1956	(United States) Continental Can Company	(United States) Robert Gair Company	0.549	6.5
6	1954	(United States) Olin Industries	(United States) Mathieson Chemical	0.500	6
7	1955	(United States) Sunray Oil Corporation	(United States) Mid-Continent Petroleum Corporation	0.486	5.8
8	1955	(United States) Sperry Corporation	(United States) Remington Rand	0.466	5.6
9	1953	(United States) Gulf Oil	(United States) Warren Petroleum Corporation	0.420	5.1
10	1954	(United States) Hudson Motor Car Company	(United States) Nash-Kelvinator	0.355	4.3

=== 1960s ===
Top 10 M&A deals worldwide by value from 1960 to 1969:

Rank	Year	Purchaser	Purchased	Transaction value (in billions USD)	Inflation adjusted (in billions USD)
1	1969	(United States) Atlantic Richfield	(United States) Sinclair Oil Corporation	3.7	32.5
2	1965	(United States) Union Oil	(United States) Pure Oil	1.5	15.3
3	1968	(United States) Hunt-Wesson	Canada Dry (United States) McCall Corporation	1.0	9.3
4	1969	(United States) Xerox Corporation	(United States) Scientific Data Systems	0.925	8.1
5	1967	(United States) Rockwell-Standard	(United States) North American Aviation	0.922	8.9
6	1968	(United States) Sun Oil	(United States) Sunray DX Oil Company	0.763	7.1
7	1965	(United States) Continental Oil Company	(United States) Consolidation Coal	0.620	6.3
8	1961	(United States) American-Marietta Corporation	(United States) Glenn L. Martin Company	0.600	6.5
9	1968	(United States) Control Data Corporation	(United States) Commercial Credit Company	0.582	5.4
10	1967	(United States) Studebaker Corporation	(United States) Worthington Corporation	0.550	5.3

=== 1970s ===
Top 15 M&A deals worldwide by value from 1970 to 1979:

Rank	Year	Purchaser	Purchased	Transaction value (in billions USD)	Inflation adjusted (in billions USD)
1	1979	(United States) Shell Oil Company	(United States) Belridge Oil Company	3.65	16.2
2	1976	(United States) General Electric	(United States) Utah International	2.17	12.3
3	1979	(United States) RCA	(United States) CIT Financial	1.3	5.8
4	1979	(United States) Exxon	(United States) Reliance Electric	1.2	5.3
5	1978	(United States) United Technologies	(United States) Carrier Corporation	1.0	4.9
6	1979	(United States) Mobil	(United States) General Crude Oil	0.765	3.4
7	1976	(United States) Atlantic Richfield	(United States) Anaconda Copper	0.760	4.3
8	1978	(United States) R. J. Reynolds Industries	(United States) Del Monte Corporation	0.620	3.1
9	1978	(United States) Johns Manville	(United States) Olinkraft Inc	0.585	2.9
10	1977	(United States) Kennecott Copper	(United States) Carborundum Corporation	0.567	3
11	1978	(United States) Philip Morris	(United States) Seven-Up Bottling Co	0.520	2.6
12	1978	(United States) Beatrice Foods	(United States) Tropicana Products	0.488	2.4
13	1977	(United Kingdom) (Netherlands) Unilever	(United States) National Starch and Chemical	0.485	2.6
14	1974	(United Kingdom) Burmah Oil	(United States) Signal Oil & Gas	0.480	3.1
15	1979	(United States) American Brands	(United States) Franklin Life Insurance	0.465	2.1

=== 1980s ===
Top 30 M&A deals worldwide by value from 1980 to 1989:

Rank	Year	Purchaser	Purchased	Transaction value (in billions USD)	Inflation adjusted (in billions USD)
1	1989	(United States) Kohlberg Kravis Roberts	(United States) RJR Nabisco	31.0	80.5
2	1989	(Japan) Mitsui Bank	(Japan) Taiyo Kobe Bank	22.8	59.2
3	1989	(United States) Time Inc.	(United States) Warner Communications	15.2	39.5
4	1984	(United States) Standard Oil of California	(United States) Gulf Oil	13.2	40.9
5	1988	(United States) Philip Morris	(United States) Kraft Foods	13.1	35.7
6	1989	(United States) Bristol Myers	(United States) Squibb	12.0	31.2
7	1984	(United States) Texaco	(United States) Getty Oil	10.1	31.3
8	1989	(United Kingdom) Beecham Group	(United States) SmithKline Beckman	7.9	20.5
9	1987	(United Kingdom) BP	(United States) Standard Oil of Ohio	7.8	22.1
10	1981	(United States) E. I. du Pont de Nemours and Company	(United States) Conoco	7.3	25.9
11	1988	(Canada) Campeau Corporation	(United States) Federated Department Stores	6.6	18
12	1985	(United States) General Electric	(United States) RCA	6.3	18.9
13	1982	United States Steel Corp.	(United States) Marathon Oil	6.0	20
14	1985	(United States) Kohlberg Kravis Roberts	(United States) Beatrice Companies	6.0	18
15	1985	(United States) Philip Morris Companies	(United States) General Foods	5.8	17.4
16	1987	(Canada) Dome Mines	(Canada) Placer Development (Canada) Campbell Red Lake Mines	5.8	16.4
17	1984	(United States) Mobil	(United States) Superior Oil Company	5.7	17.7
18	1988	(United Kingdom) Grand Metropolitan	(United States) Pillsbury Company	5.7	15.5
19	1989	(United States) Dow Chemical Company	(United States) Marion Laboratories	5.7	14.8
20	1984	(United Kingdom) (Netherlands) Royal Dutch/Shell Group	(United States) Shell Oil Company	5.5	17
21	1989	(United Kingdom) Hanson	(United Kingdom) Consolidated Gold Fields	5.5	14.3
22	1985	(United States) General Motors	(United States) Hughes Aircraft Company	5.2	15.6
23	1988	(United Kingdom) British American Tobacco ( (United States) Batus Inc.)	(United States) Farmers Insurance Group	5.2	14.2
24	1987	(United States) John Philp Thompson Sr.	(United States) Southland Corporation	5.1	14.5
25	1988	(United States) Thomas F. Frist Jr. (United States) Richard Rainwater	(United States) HCA Healthcare	5.1	13.9
26	1988	(United States) Eastman Kodak	(United States) Sterling Drug	5.1	13.9
27	1981	(France) Elf Aquitaine	(United States) Texasgulf Inc.	5.0	17.7
28	1985	(United States) R.J. Reynolds Industries	(United States) Nabisco Brands	4.9	14.7
29	1986	(United States) Burroughs Corporation	(United States) Sperry Corporation	4.8	14.1
30	1989	(Japan) Sony	(United States) Columbia Pictures	4.8	12.5

=== 1990s ===
Top M&A deals worldwide by value ($20 billion or larger) from 1990 to 1999:

Rank	Year	Purchaser	Purchased	Transaction value (in billions USD)	Inflation adjusted (in billions USD)
1	1999	(United Kingdom) Vodafone Airtouch plc	(Germany) Mannesmann	183.0	353.7
2	1999	(United States) Pfizer	(United States) Warner-Lambert	90.0	173.9
3	1998	(United States) Exxon	(United States) Mobil	77.2	152.5
4	1998	(United States) Citicorp	(United States) Travelers Group	70.0	138.3
5	1999	(United States) Bell Atlantic (Wireless Unit) (Note: Joint Venture)	(United Kingdom) Vodafone Airtouch plc (US Wireless Unit)	70.0	135.3
6	1998	(United Kingdom) Zeneca	(Sweden) Astra AB	67.0	132.3
7	1998	(United States) NationsBank	(United States) Bank America	62.0	122.5
8	1999	(United States) SBC Communications	(United States) Ameritech Corporation	62.0	119.8
9	1999	(United Kingdom) Vodafone	(United States) AirTouch Communications	56.0	108.2
10	1999	(France) TotalFina	(France) Elf Aquitaine	54.3	104.9
11	1998	(United States) Bell Atlantic	(United States) GTE	53.36	105.4
12	1996	(United States) Bell Atlantic	(United States) NYNEX	52.0	106.7
13	1998	(United Kingdom) BP	(United States) Amoco	49.0	96.8
14	1999	(United States) AT&T	(United States) Tele-Communications Inc.	48.0	92.8
15	1999	(Japan) The Sumitomo Bank	(Japan) The Sakura Bank	45.5	87.9
16	1999	(United States) Qwest Communications	(United States) US West	44.0	85
17	1998	(Germany) Hoechst AG	(France) Rhône-Poulenc	43.0	84.9
18	1999	Royal Bank of Scotland Group	(United Kingdom) National Westminster Bank	42.5	82.1
19	1999	(Japan) Fuji Bank	Dai-Ichi Kangyo Bank; Industrial Bank of Japan	40.1	77.5
20	1997	(Switzerland) Zurich Insurance Group	(United Kingdom) British American Tobacco (Financial Division)	38.0	76.2
21	1998	(Germany) Daimler-Benz	(United States) Chrysler	38.0	75.1
22	1997	(United States) Worldcom	(United States) MCI Communications	37.0	74.2
23	1999	(Germany) Mannesmann	(United Kingdom) Orange UK	36.0	69.6
24	1999	(United States) Viacom	(United States) CBS Corporation	35.6	68.8
25	1998	(United States) Wells Fargo	(United States) Norwest Corporation	34.0	67.2
26	1999	(Italy) Olivetti	(Italy) Telecom Italia (55% Stake)	34.0	65.7
27	1995	(Japan) Mitsubishi Bank	(Japan) The Bank of Tokyo	33.8	71.4
28	1998	(United States) Banc One	(United States) First Chicago Bank	29.8	58.9
29	1996	(Switzerland) Ciba-Geigy	(Switzerland) Sandoz	27.0	55.4
30	1999	(United Kingdom) BP-Amoco	(United States) Atlantic Richfield Company	26.8	51.8
31	1999	(United States) Monsanto	(United States) Pharmacia & Upjohn	26.5	51.2
32	1999	(United States) Lucent	(United States) Ascend Communications	25.2	48.7
33	1997	Union Bank of Switzerland	(Switzerland) Swiss Bank Corporation	25.0	50.1
34	1999	(United States) Clear Channel Broadcasting	(United States) AMFM Broadcasting Licenses, LLC	23.8	46
35	1998	(United States) Berkshire Hathaway	(United States) Gen Re	22.0	43.5
36	1999	(France) Banque Nationale de Paris	(France) Paribas	20.0	38.7

=== 2000s ===
Top M&A deals worldwide by value ($20 billion or larger) from 2000 to 2009:

Rank	Year	Purchaser	Purchased	Transaction value (in billions USD)	Inflation adjusted (in billions USD)
1	2000	(United States) AOL	(United States) Time Warner	182.0	340.3
2	2007	Gaz de France	(France) Suez S.A.	107.0	166.1
3	2007	(Scotland) (Belgium) (Spain) RFS Holdings	(Netherlands) ABN Amro	98.0	152.2
4	2004	(Netherlands) Royal Dutch Petroleum (Note: Dual Structure Consolidation)	(United Kingdom) Shell Transport & Trading Company plc	95.0	161.9
5	2000	(United Kingdom) Glaxo Wellcome	(United Kingdom) SmithKline Beecham	76.0	142.1
6	2001	(United States) Comcast	(United States) AT&T Broadband	72.0	130.9
7	2006	(Italy) Banca Intesa	(Italy) Sanpaolo IMI	71.0	113.4
8	2009	(United States) Pfizer	(United States) Wyeth	68.0	102
9	2008	United States Department of the Treasury (Note: Bailout)	(United States) American International Group	67.8	101.4
10	2006	(United States) AT&T	(United States) BellSouth	67.0	107
11	2008	(Italy) Enel (Spain) Acciona	(Spain) Endesa	65.3	97.6
12	2004	(France) Sanofi	(France) Aventis	64.2	109.4
13	2002	(United States) AT&T	(United States) MediaOne	62.0	111
14	2002	(United States) Pfizer	(United States) Pharmacia Corp.	60.0	107.4
15	2004	(United States) JPMorgan Chase	(United States) Bank One Corporation	58.0	98.9
16	2008	(United Kingdom) HM Treasury	Royal Bank of Scotland Group	58.0	86.7
17	2005	(United States) Procter & Gamble	(United States) Gillette	57.0	94
18	2008	(Belgium) InBev	(United States) Anheuser-Busch	52.0	77.8
19	2000	(Germany) Deutsche Telekom	(United States) Voicestream	50.7	94.8
20	2008	(United Kingdom) Lloyds TSB Group	(United Kingdom) HBOS	50.0	74.8
21	2008	(United States) Bank of America	(United States) Merrill Lynch & Co.	50.0	74.8
22	2009	United States Department of the Treasury	(United States) General Motors	49.5	74.3
23	2003	(United States) Bank of America	(United States) FleetBoston Financial	47.0	82.3
24	2009	(Switzerland) Roche Holding AG	(United States) Genentech	46.8	70.2
25	2008	United States Department of the Treasury	(United States) Citigroup	45.0	67.3
26	2008	United States Department of the Treasury	(United States) Bank of America	45.0	67.3
27	2009	(United States) Merck & Co.	(United States) Schering-Plough	41.1	61.7
28	2000	(United States) JDS Uniphase	(United States) SDL Inc.	41.0	76.7
29	2004	(United States) Cingular	(United States) AT&T Wireless	41.0	69.9
30	2009	(United States) ExxonMobil	(United States) XTO Energy	41.0	61.5
31	2000	France Télécom	(United Kingdom) Vodafone Airtouch plc ( (United Kingdom) Orange UK)	40.3	75.3
32	2008	(Switzerland) Novartis	(United States) Alcon	39.0	58.3
33	2007	(United Kingdom) (Australia) Rio Tinto	(Canada) Alcan	38.1	59.2
34	2000	(Hong Kong) Pacific Century Cyber Works	(Hong Kong) Cable & Wireless HKT Ltd	38.0	71
35	2005	(Japan) Tokyo Mitsubishi	(Japan) UFJ Holdings	38.0	62.6
36	2006	(Mexico) América Móvil	(Mexico) América Telecom	37.0	59.1
37	2006	(United States) The Blackstone Group	(United States) Equity Office	36.0	57.5
38	2005	(United States) ConocoPhillips	(United States) Burlington Resources	35.6	58.7
39	2000	(United States) Chevron Corporation	(United States) Texaco	35.0	65.4
40	2005	(United States) Sprint Corporation	(United States) Nextel Communications	35.0	57.7
41	2005	(United States) Bank of America	(United States) MBNA	34.2	56.4
42	2000	(France) Vivendi	(Canada) Seagram	34.0	63.6
43	2006	(Netherlands) Mittal Steel Company	(Luxembourg) Arcelor	33.65	53.7
44	2007	(United States) Kohlberg Kravis Roberts (United States) Texas Pacific Group	(United States) TXU Corp.	31.8	49.4
45	2005	(Spain) Telefónica	(United Kingdom) O2	31.6	52.1
46	2006	(Finland) Nokia Corporation (Telecommunication Network Equipment Unit)	(Germany) Siemens AG (Telecommunication Network Equipment Unit)	31.6	50.5
47	2000	(United States) Citigroup	(United States) Associates First Capital Corporation	31.0	58
48	2000	(United States) Chase Manhattan Bank	(United States) J.P. Morgan & Co.	30.9	57.8
49	2007	(Norway) Statoil	(Norway) Norsk Hydro	30.0	46.6
50	2009	(United States) Comcast	(United States) General Electric ( (United States) NBCUniversal)	30.0	45
51	2007	(United States) Kohlberg Kravis Roberts	(United States) First Data	29.0	45
52	2007	(Italy) UniCredit	(Italy) Capitalia	29.0	45
53	2004	(Belgium) KBC Bank	(Belgium) Almanij	28.12	47.9
54	2008	(United States) Verizon Wireless	(United States) Alltel	28.1	42
55	2001	(Australia) BHP Limited	(United Kingdom) Billiton plc	28.0	50.9
56	2003	(Italy) Olivetti	(Italy) Telecom Italia (Remaining 45% Stake)	27.8	48.7
57	2007	(United States) Texas Pacific Group (United States) Goldman Sachs Capital Partners	(United States) Alltel	27.5	42.7
58	2006	(United States) Boston Scientific	(United States) Guidant	27.2	43.4
59	2006	(United States) Thomas H. Lee Partners (United States) Bain Capital	(United States) Clear Channel Broadcasting	26.7	42.6
60	2009	(United States) Berkshire Hathaway	(United States) Burlington Northern Santa Fe Corp.	26.3	39.5
61	2007	(United States) The Blackstone Group	(United States) Hilton Hotels Corp	26.0	40.4
62	2007	(United States) Freeport-McMoRan	(United States) Phelps Dodge	25.9	40.2
63	2006	(United States) Wachovia	(United States) Golden West Financial	25.5	40.7
64	2008	(United Kingdom) HM Treasury	(United Kingdom) Lloyds Banking Group	25.4	38
65	2008	(United States) Apollo Management (United States) Texas Pacific Group	(United States) Harrahs Entertainment	25.1	37.5
66	2001	(United States) Hewlett Packard Company	(United States) Compaq	25.0	45.5
67	2008	United States Department of the Treasury	(United States) JPMorgan Chase	25.0	37.4
68	2008	United States Department of the Treasury	(United States) Wells Fargo	25.0	37.4
69	2008	(Netherlands) Ministry of Finance	(Belgium) Fortis (Dutch Unit)	23.3	34.8
70	2001	(United States) American International Group	(United States) American General	23.0	41.8
71	2008	(United States) Mars, Incorporated	(United States) Wm. Wrigley Jr. Company	23.0	34.4
72	2007	(Spain) Iberdrola	(Scotland) Scottish Power	22.5	34.9
73	2006	(United States) Richard Kinder (United States) Goldman Sachs Capital Partners (United States) The Carlyle Group (United States) Riverstone Holdings (United States) American International Group	(United States) Kinder Morgan	22.0	35.1
74	2007	(United States) Kohlberg Kravis Roberts (Italy) Stefano Pessina	(United Kingdom) Alliance Boots	22.0	34.2
75	2006	(Germany) Bayer	(Germany) Schering AG	21.5	34.3
76	2000	(United States) Verisign	(United States) Network Solutions	21.0	39.3
77	2000	(United States) Firstar Corporation	(United States) U.S. Bancorp	21.0	39.3
78	2006	(United States) Thomas F. Frist Jr. (United States) Bain Capital (United States) Kohlberg Kravis Roberts (United States) Merrill Lynch Global Private Equity	(United States) HCA Healthcare	21.0	33.5
79	2006	(United States) CVS	(United States) Caremark RX	21.0	33.5
80	2007	(United States) Bank of America	(Netherlands) ABN AMRO ( (United States) LaSalle Bank)	21.0	32.6
81	2000	(United Kingdom) (Netherlands) Unilever	(United States) Bestfoods	20.3	38
82	2001	(Germany) Allianz	(Germany) Dresdner Bank	20.0	36.4
83	2006	(Spain) Ferrovial	(United Kingdom) BAA	20.0	31.9

=== 2010s ===
Top M&A deals worldwide by value ($20 billion or larger) from 2010 to 2019:

Rank	Year	Purchaser	Purchased	Transaction value (in billions USD) (with debt)	Inflation adjusted (in billions USD) (with debt)	Ref
1	2013	(United States) Verizon Communications	(United Kingdom) Vodafone (Remaining Verizon Wireless 45% Stake)	130.0	179.7	
2	2015	(United States) Dow Chemical	(United States) E. I. du Pont de Nemours and Company	130.0	176.6	
3	2019	(United States) United Technologies (Aerospace Division)	(United States) Raytheon	121.0	152.4	
4	2015	(Belgium) AB InBev	(United Kingdom) SABMiller	107.0	145.3	
5	2015	(United States) Heinz	(United States) Kraft	100.0	135.8	
6	2018	(United States) Energy Transfer Equity	(United States) Energy Transfer Partners	90.0	115.4	
7	2017	(Germany) Linde AG	(United States) Praxair	86.0	113	(Note: Tax Inversion)
8	2016	(United States) AT&T	(United States) Time Warner	85.4 — 108.7	114.6 — 145.8	
9	2015	(Hong Kong) Cheung Kong Holdings	(Hong Kong) Hutchison Whampoa	85.0	115.5	
10	2015	(United States) Charter Communications	(United States) Time Warner Cable	78.7	106.9	
11	2019	(United States) Bristol-Myers Squibb	(United States) Celgene	74.0 — 95.0	93.2 — 119.6	
12	2018	(United States) The Walt Disney Company	(United States) 21st Century Fox	71.3 — 85.1	91.4 — 109.1	
13	2014	(United States) Kinder Morgan	(United States) Kinder Morgan Energy Partners (United States) Kinder Morgan Management (United States) El Paso Pipeline Partners	71.0	96.6	
14	2015	(Republic of Ireland) (United States) Actavis	(United States) Allergan	70.5	95.8	
15	2015	(Netherlands) (United Kingdom) Royal Dutch Shell	(United Kingdom) BG Group	70.0 — 81.9	95.1 — 111.2	
16	2019	(Saudi Arabia) Saudi Aramco	(Saudi Arabia) SABIC	69.1	87	
17	2017	(United States) CVS Health	(United States) Aetna	69.0	90.6	
18	2015	(United States) Dell	(United States) EMC Corporation	67.0	91	
19	2018	(Japan) Takeda Pharmaceutical	(Republic of Ireland) (United Kingdom) Shire	64.3	82.4	
20	2019	(United States) AbbVie	(Republic of Ireland) (United States) Allergan	63.0	79.3	
21	2019	(United Kingdom) GlaxoSmithKline (Consumer Health Unit)	(United States) Pfizer (Consumer Health Unit)	62.8	79.1	
22	2014	(Switzerland) Holcim	(France) Lafarge S.A.	60.0	81.6	
23	2017	(France) Essilor	(Italy) Luxottica	58.5	76.8	
24	2013	(Russia) Rosneft	(Russia) TNK-BP	55.0	76	
25	2016	(Germany) Bayer	(United States) Monsanto	54.5 — 63.5	73.1 — 85.2	
26	2018	(United States) Cigna	(United States) Express Scripts	54.0 — 67.0	69.2 — 85.9	
27	2019	(France) Groupe PSA	(United Kingdom) Fiat Chrysler	50.0	63	
28	2014	(United States) AT&T	(United States) DirecTV	49.0 — 67.1	66.6 — 91.3	
29	2017	(United Kingdom) British American Tobacco	(United States) R. J. Reynolds Tobacco Company	49.0	64.4	
30	2019	(United States) DuPont (Nutrition & Biosciences Division)	(United States) International Flavors & Fragrances	45.4	57.2	
31	2016	ChemChina	(Switzerland) Syngenta	43.0	57.7	
32	2014	(United States) Medtronic	(Republic of Ireland) (United States) Covidien	42.9	58.3	
33	2015	(Israel) Teva Pharmaceutical Industries	(Republic of Ireland) (United States) Allergan ( (Republic of Ireland) (United States) Actavis Generics)	40.5	55	
34	2018	(United States) Comcast	(United Kingdom) Sky	39.0	50	
35	2018	(Germany) E.ON SE	(Germany) Innogy SE	38.5	49.4	
36	2019	(United States) Occidental Petroleum Corp	(United States) Anadarko Petroleum	38.0 — 57.0	47.9 — 71.8	
37	2015	(United States) Berkshire Hathaway	(United States) Precision Castparts	37.2	50.5	
38	2015	(Singapore) Avago Technologies	(United States) Broadcom Corporation	37.0	50.3	
39	2018	(United States) T-Mobile US	(United States) Sprint Corporation	37.0	47.4	
40	2019	(United States) Fidelity National Information Services	(United States) Worldpay, Inc.	35.0 — 43	44.1 — 54.1	
41	2018	(United States) Harris Corporation	(United States) L3 Technologies	34.0	43.6	
42	2018	(United States) IBM	(United States) Red Hat	34.0	43.6	
43	2016	(Republic of Ireland) (United Kingdom) Shire	(United States) Baxalta	32.0 — 35	42.9 — 47	
44	2016	(Japan) Softbank Group	(United Kingdom) Arm Holdings	31.4	42.1	
45	2012	(Switzerland) Glencore	(Switzerland) Xstrata	31.0	43.5	
46	2010	(France) GDF Suez	(United Kingdom) International Power	30.0	44.3	
47	2016	(United States) General Electric ( (United States) GE Oil and Gas)	(United States) Baker Hughes	30.0	40.2	
48	2017	(United States) United Technologies	(United States) Rockwell Collins	30.0	39.4	
49	2017	(United States) Johnson & Johnson	(Switzerland) Actelion	30.0	39.4	
50	2019	Yahoo! Japan	(Japan) Line Corporation	30.0	37.8	
51	2012	(United States) T-Mobile US	(United States) MetroPCS	29.6	41.5	
52	2011	(United States) Express Scripts	(United States) Medco Health Solutions	29.1	41.6	
53	2015	(Switzerland) ACE Ltd	(United States) Chubb Corporation	28.3	38.4	
54	2016	(Canada) Enbridge	(United States) Spectra Energy	28.0	37.6	
55	2019	(United States) BB&T	(United States) SunTrust Banks	28.0	35.3	
56	2014	(United States) Reynolds American	(United States) Lorillard Tobacco Company	27.4	37.3	
57	2016	(Canada) Agrium	(Canada) Potash Corp of Saskatchewan Inc	27.0	36.2	
58	2019	(United Kingdom) London Stock Exchange Group	(United Kingdom) Refinitiv	27.0	34	
59	2016	(United States) Microsoft	(United States) LinkedIn Corp	26.2	35.1	
60	2011	(United States) Duke Energy	(United States) Progress Energy Inc	26.0	37.2	
61	2019	(United States) Charles Schwab	(United States) TD Ameritrade	26.0	32.7	
62	2014	(Republic of Ireland) (United States) Actavis	(United States) Forest Laboratories	25.0	34	
63	2015	(Canada) Enbridge Income Fund	(Canada) Enbridge (Canadian liquids pipeline business & certain renewable energy assets)	25.0	34	
64	2016	(United States) Abbott Laboratories	(United States) St Jude Medical	25.0 — 30.5	33.5 — 40.9	
65	2019	(United States) Viacom	(United States) CBS Corporation	25.0	31.5	
66	2019	(United States) Pfizer (Upjohn Off-Patent Medicine Division)	(Netherlands) (United States) Mylan	25.0	31.5	
67	2017	(France) Unibail-Rodamco SE	(Australia) Westfield Corporation	24.7	32.4	
68	2013	(United States) Michael Dell (United States) Silver Lake Partners	(United States) Dell	24.4	33.7	
69	2010	(United States) CenturyLink	(United States) Qwest Corporation	24.0	35.4	
70	2012	(Spain) Ministry of Economy	(Spain) Bankia	24.0	33.7	
71	2015	(Netherlands) VimpelCom (Italian Assets)	(Cayman Islands) (Hong Kong) CK Hutchison Holdings (Italian Assets)	24.0	32.6	
72	2016	(United States) CenturyLink	(United States) Level 3 Communications	24.0	32.2	
73	2017	(United States) Becton, Dickinson and Company	(United States) C. R. Bard	24.0	31.5	
74	2018	(United States) Dell	(United States) VMware	23.9	30.6	
75	2013	(United States) Liberty Global	(United Kingdom) Virgin Media	23.3	32.2	
76	2017	(United States) Visa Inc.	(United Kingdom) Visa Europe	23.3	30.6	
77	2013	(United States) Berkshire Hathaway (United States) 3G Capital	(United States) Heinz	23.0	31.8	
78	2014	(France) Numericable	(France) SFR	23.0	31.3	
79	2017	(United Kingdom) Vodafone (Indian Operations)	(India) Idea Cellular	23.0	30.2	
80	2018	(United States) Marathon Petroleum Corp	(United States) Andeavor	23.0 — 35.6	29.5 — 45.6	
81	2012	(Japan) Nippon Steel	(Japan) Sumitomo Metal Industries	22.45	31.5	
82	2014	(United States) Facebook	(United States) WhatsApp	22.0	29.9	
83	2018	(Italy) Atlantia (Spain) Grupo ACS	(Spain) Abertis	22.0	28.2	
84	2019	(United States) Fiserv	(United States) First Data	22.0	27.7	
85	2018	(United Kingdom) Vodafone	(United Kingdom) Liberty Global (Germany & Eastern Europe Ops)	21.8	28	
86	2012	(Japan) Softbank Group	(United States) Sprint Corporation	21.6	30.3	
87	2010	(Netherlands) VimpelCom	(Netherlands) Weather Investments	21.5	31.7	
88	2019	(United States) Global Payments	(United States) TSYS	21.5	27.1	
89	2019	(United States) Danaher Corporation	(United States) GE (Biopharma Division)	21.4	26.9	
90	2011	(United States) Johnson & Johnson	(Switzerland) Synthes	21.3	30.5	
91	2010	(Mexico) América Móvil	(Mexico) Telmex	21.0	31	
92	2011	(United States) Kinder Morgan	(United States) El Paso Corporation	21.0	30.1	
93	2015	(United States) MPLX	(United States) MarkWest Energy	21.0	28.5	
94	2015	(United States) AbbVie	(United States) Pharmacyclics	21.0	28.5	
95	2018	(United States) Keurig Green Mountain	(United States) Dr Pepper Snapple Group	21.0	26.9	
96	2011	(France) Sanofi	(United States) Genzyme	20.1	28.8	
97	2012	(Belgium) AB InBev	(Mexico) Grupo Modelo	20.1	28.2	
98	2016	(United States) Energy Transfer Partners	(United States) Sunoco Logistics Partners	20.0	26.8	
99	2016	(France) SACAM Mutualisation	(France) Crédit Agricole (39 Regional Operators)	20.0	26.8	
100	2018	(United States) The Blackstone Group	(Canada) Thomson Reuters (Financial & Risk Unit)	20.0	25.6	

=== 2020s ===
Top M&A deals worldwide by value ($20 billion or larger) from 2020 to 2029:

Key
†	Pending

Rank	Year	Purchaser	Purchased	Transaction value (in billions USD) (with debt)	Inflation adjusted (in billions USD) (with debt)	Ref
1	2026	(United States) SpaceX	(United States) xAI	250.0	250	
2	2026	(United States) Paramount Skydance	(United States) Warner Bros. Discovery	111.0	111	
3 †	2026	(United States) Marvell Technology	(United States) Lumentum	102.5	102.5	
4 †	2025	(United States) Union Pacific Railroad	(United States) Norfolk Southern Railway	85.0	85	
5	2020	(United Kingdom) Unilever plc	(Netherlands) Unilever N.V.	81.0	100.8	
6	2021	(Australia) BHP Group Limited	(United Kingdom) BHP Group plc	80.7	95.9	
7	2021	(United Kingdom) Royal Dutch Shell plc	(Netherlands) Royal Dutch Shell N.V.	71.5	85	
8	2026	(United States) AvalonBay Communities	(United States) Equity Residential	69.0	69	
9	2022	(United States) Microsoft	(United States) Activision Blizzard	68.7	75.6	
10 †	2026	(United States) NextEra Energy	(United States) Dominion Energy	66.8	66.8	
11 †	2026	(United Kingdom) Unilever (Food Business)	(United States) McCormick & Company	65.0	65	
12	2022	(United States) Broadcom	(United States) VMware	61.0 — 69.0	67.1 — 75.9	
13	2022	(India) HDFC Bank	(India) Housing Development Finance Corporation	60.0	66	
14	2025	(Austria) OMV ( (Austria) Borealis 75% stake) (United Arab Emirates) ADNOC ( (Austria) Borealis 25% stake)	(United Arab Emirates) ADNOC ( (United Arab Emirates) Borouge 54% stake) (Austria) Borealis ( (United Arab Emirates) Borouge 36% stake)	60.0	60	
15	2026	(United States) SpaceX	(United States) Cursor	60.0	60	
16	2023	(United States) ExxonMobil	(United States) Pioneer Natural Resources	59.5 — 64.5	62.9 — 68.2	
17	2026	(United States) Devon Energy	(United States) Coterra	58.0	58	
18	2022	(Italy) Edizione (United States) Blackstone Inc.	(Italy) Atlantia	56.32	62	
19	2025	(Saudi Arabia) Public Investment Fund (United States) Silver Lake (United States) Affinity Partners	(United States) Electronic Arts	55.0	55	
20	2023	(United States) Chevron Corporation	(United States) Hess Corporation	53.0 — 60.0	56 — 63.4	
21 †	2025	(United Kingdom) Anglo American plc	(Canada) Teck Resources	53.0	53	
22	2025	(United States) Kimberly-Clark	(United States) Kenvue	48.7	48.7	
23	2020	(United States) S&P Global	(United Kingdom) IHS Markit	44.0	54.7	
24	2022	(United States) Elon Musk	(United States) Twitter, Inc.	44.0	48.4	
25	2021	(United States) Discovery, Inc.	(United States) AT&T ( (United States) WarnerMedia)	43.0	51.1	
26	2023	(United States) Pfizer	(United States) Seagen	43.0	45.4	
27	2020	(Japan) Nippon Telegraph and Telephone	(Japan) NTT Docomo	40.0	49.8	
28	2025	(United States) AI Infrastructure Partnership (United States) Microsoft (United States) Nvidia (United States) BlackRock (United States) BlackRock ( (United States) Global Infrastructure Partners) (United States) xAI (United Arab Emirates) MGX Fund Management Limited (Singapore) Temasek	(Australia) Macquarie Group ( (United States) Aligned Data Centers)	40.0	40	
29	2025	(Japan) Toyota	(Japan) Toyota Industries	39.66	39.7	
30	2020	(United Kingdom) AstraZeneca	(United States) Alexion Pharmaceuticals	39.0	48.5	
31	2020	(United Kingdom) Liberty Global ( (United Kingdom) Virgin Media)	(Spain) Telefónica ( (United Kingdom) O2)	38.0	47.3	
32	2024	(United States) Capital One	(United States) Discover Financial	35.3	36.2	
33	2020	(United States) Advanced Micro Devices	(United States) Xilinx	35.0	43.5	
34	2024	(United States) Synopsys	(United States) Ansys	35.0	35.9	
35	2021	(United States) Blackstone Inc (United States) The Carlyle Group (United States) Hellman & Friedman	(United States) Medline Industries	34.0	40.4	
36	2023	(United States) (Bermuda) Bunge Limited	(Netherlands) Viterra	34.0	35.9	
37	2025	(United States) xAI	(United States) X Corp.	33.0 — 45.0	33 — 45	
38	2025	(United States) Alphabet Inc.	(United States) Wiz, Inc.	32.0	32	
39	2021	(Canada) Canadian Pacific Railway	(United States) Kansas City Southern	31.0	36.8	
40	2021	(Republic of Ireland) AerCap	(United States) General Electric ( (Republic of Ireland) (United States) GECAS)	30.0	35.6	
41	2024	(United States) Mars Inc.	(United States) Kellanova	30.0 — 35.9	30.8 — 36.8	
42	2021	(United States) Square, Inc.	(Australia) Afterpay	29.0	34.5	
43 †	2026	(United States) Sysco	(Eswatini) Kirsh Group ( (United States) Jetro Restaurant Depot)	29.0	29	
44	2021	(United States) Oracle Corporation	(United States) Cerner Corporation	28.3	33.6	
45	2023	(United States) Cisco	(United States) Splunk	28.0	29.6	
46	2022	(United States) Amgen	(Republic of Ireland) (United States) Horizon Therapeutics	27.8	30.6	
47	2020	(United States) Salesforce.com	(United States) Slack Technologies	27.7	34.5	
48	2022	(United States) Prologis	(United States) Duke Realty	26.0	28.6	
49	2024	(United States) Diamondback Energy	(United States) Endeavor Energy Resources	26.0	26.7	
50	2025	(United States) Palo Alto Networks	(Israel) CyberArk	25.0	25	
51	2025	(United States) Global Payments	(United States) GTCR ( (United States) Worldpay 55% stake) (United States) FIS ( (United States) Worldpay 45% stake)	24.25	24.3	
52 †	2026	(Finland) Kone	(United States) Advent International ( (Germany) ThyssenKrupp Elevator stake) (United Kingdom) Cinven ( (Germany) ThyssenKrupp Elevator stake)	24.0	24	
53 †	2026	(France) Bouygues ( (France) Bouygues Telecom) (France) Orange Group (France) Iliad SA ( (France) Free)	(Luxembourg) Altice ( (France) SFR)	23.44	23.4	
54	2025	(United States) AT&T	(United States) EchoStar (Various Wireless Spectrum Licenses)	23.0	23	
55	2021	(Germany) Vonovia	(Germany) Deutsche Wohnen	22.7	27	
56 †	2026	(France) Schneider Electric	(United States) PTC Inc.	22.6	22.6	
57	2020	(United States) Huntington Bancshares	(United States) TCF Financial Corporation	22.0	27.4	
58 †	2026	(United States) Equitable Holdings	(United States) Corebridge Financial	22.0	22	
59	2026	(United States) Fox Corporation	(United States) Roku, Inc.	22.0	22	
60	2025	(United States) Charter Communications	(United States) Cox Enterprises ( (United States) Cox Communications)	21.9 — 34.5	21.9 — 34.5	
61	2022	(France) Orange S.A. ( (Spain) Orange España)	(Spain) Grupo MásMóvil	21.3	23.4	
62	2020	(United States) Analog Devices	(United States) Maxim Integrated	21.0	26.1	
63	2020	(Japan) Seven & i Holdings	(United States) Marathon Petroleum ( (United States) Speedway LLC)	21.0	26.1	
64	2020	(United States) Gilead Sciences	(United States) Immunomedics	21.0	26.1	
65	2022	(Netherlands) DSM	(Switzerland) Firmenich	21.0	23.1	
66	2023	(United States) Endeavor Group ( (United States) Zuffa)	(United States) WWE	21.0	22.2	
67	2025	(United States) Abbott Laboratories	(United States) Exact Sciences Corp.	21.0	21	
68	2021	(Canada) Rogers Communications	(Canada) Shaw Communications	20.8	24.7	
69	2021	(Switzerland) Roche	(Switzerland) Novartis (Entire 1/3 voting stake in Roche)	20.7	24.6	
70	2020	(United States) Advent International (United Kingdom) Cinven (Germany) RAG-Stiftung	(Germany) ThyssenKrupp (Elevator Division)	20.4	25.4	
71	2023	(United States) KKR	(Italy) TIM Group (Fixed Line Network)	20.0	21.1	

== State-owned enterprises ==
Top M&A deals worldwide by value ($20 billion or larger) between state-owned enterprises:

Rank	Year	Purchaser	Purchased	Total asset value (billions USD)	Inflation adjusted (billions USD)	Note
1	2017	(China) Shenhua Group	China Guodian Corporation	278.0	365.1	In August 2017, SASAC announced that China Guodian Corporation (one of China's largest coal-fired power generators) and Shenhua Group (China's biggest coal miner) would be jointly restructured, with Shenhua Group becoming China Energy Investment Corporation and absorbing China Guodian Corporation to become the largest power company in the world by installed capacity.
2	2015	China Minmetals	China Metallurgical Group	245.6	333.6	In December 2016, China continued its consolidation drive, focusing on their mining sector where China Minmetals Corp took over equipment maker China Metallurgical Group Corp. Minmetals was China's biggest steel and base metals trader with revenue of more than $50 billion last year, whilst China Metallurgical Group reported revenues of more than $33 billion.
3	2017	(China) Sinograin	China National Cotton Reserves Corp.	213.0	279.8	In January 2017, the Chinese government confirmed the merger of China National Cotton Reserves Corp and Sinograin as part of their drive to reduce the number of state-owned enterprises to a target of 100.
4	2018	ChemChina	(China) Sinochem	120.0	153.9	Merger of the Chinese state-controlled ChemChina and Sinochem in a deal reported to be worth $120 billion. The merger would create the largest entity in the industrial chemicals industry, overtaking BASF. In January 2020 ChemChina and Sinochem consolidated their agricultural assets into a new holding company, to be called Syngenta Group.
5	2015	China Power Investment	(China) State Nuclear Power Technology Corporation	112.6	152.9	In June 2015 the Chinese cabinet approved plans to merge state-owned China Power Investment (CPIC) with State Nuclear Power Technology increasing the exports of nuclear technology from the country, creating the new entity China Power New Energy Development Company Limited, with assets of more than $112.6 billion and annual revenues of more than $32.6 billion.
6	2018	China National Nuclear Corp	China Nuclear Engineering & Construction	99.0	126.9	Merger of China's second largest nuclear power producer, and their top nuclear power plant builder.
7	2020	China Oil and Gas Pipeline Network (PipeChina)	PetroChina (Major oil and gas pipelines and storage facility assets); Sinopec (Kanton's Yulin Pipeline Co & Beihai LNG terminal)	55.9	69.5	PetroChina, China's state-owned oil and gas firm, announced it would sell its major oil and gas pipelines and storage facilities to a newly created State-owned enterprise, China Oil and Gas Pipeline Network, for $55.9 billion. This will lead to the creation of a new company, PipeChina, of which PetroChina will own a 29.9% equity stake worth around $21 billion, with the balance of the transaction paid in cash. Sinopec also announced it would sell some oil and gas pipeline assets to PipeChina for around $6 billion, of which over $3 billion will be used for an equity interest stake. After the deals have completed, PipeChina will have a market capitalisation of 500 billion yuan ($71.3 billion); PetroChina will own 29.9% of the business, Sinopec 14% and CNOOC Gas and Power (a subsidiary CNOOC Group) will own 2.9%.
8	2014	(China) CITIC Pacific	(Hong Kong) CITIC Limited	50.0	68	CITIC Pacific Ltd completed its acquisition of 100 percent of CITIC Ltd after receiving all necessary regulatory approvals, and became China's largest conglomerate with a market value of about $50 billion.
9	2000	China Mobile (Hong Kong) Ltd	(China) Beijing Mobile (China) Shanghai Mobile (China) Tianjin Mobile (China) Hebei Mobile (China) Liaoning Mobile (China) Shandong Mobile (China) Guangxi Mobile	34.2	63.9	China Mobile acquired seven Chinese state-owned mobile communications businesses as part of a consolidation effort.
10	2020	(Russia) Ministry of Finance	Central Bank of Russia ( Sberbank of Russia 50% Stake)	28.31	35.2	Russia tapped the Russian National Wealth Fund to buy the central bank's stake in Sberbank, ending years of debate about potential conflicts of interest arising from the central bank controlling the country's top lender.
11	2008	China Unicom	China Netcom	24.0	35.9	The merger took place as part of the first step in the country's reshuffling of its telecom shops.

== Largest ever deals which have failed to complete ==
This lists catalogues M&A deals ($20 billion or larger in transaction value) which were confirmed, but for a number of reasons, failed to complete.

Rank	Year	Purchaser	Purchased	Transaction value (in billions USD)	Inflation adjusted value	Note
1	2020	(United Kingdom) Astra Zeneca	(United States) Gilead Sciences	232.0	288.6	Astra Zeneca approached Gilead about a merger; however, a combination of a lack of interest from Gilead and the COVID-19 pandemic led to any further talking being dropped. The deal also floundered due to the potential to distract both companies from their own pipelines and ongoing COVID-19 vaccine efforts.
2	2019	(United States) Altria	(United States) Philip Morris International	200.0	251.9	The merger was called off after a chilly reaction from investors, vaping related illnesses, and Altria's increasingly scrutinized $12.8 billion investment in vaping leader Juul.
3	2015	(United States) Pfizer	(Republic of Ireland) (United States) Allergan	160.0	217.3	The deal fell through over changes made to tax inversion legislation by the Government of the United States.
4	2008	(United Kingdom) (Australia) BHP Billiton	(United Kingdom) (Australia) Rio Tinto	148.0	221.3	As commodity prices fell in value, the deal became too risky for BHP Billiton to complete.
5	2017	(United States) Kraft Heinz	(United Kingdom) (Netherlands) Unilever	143.0	187.8	Kraft's offer was an 18% premium to Unilever's closing share price the day before the announcement, however Unilever Executives claimed the deal undervalued the company, as well as job-cut implications and regulator approval issues. The bid was formally dropped on February 19, citing the complexities of acquiring control in a Dutch entity without the support of shareholders.
6	2023	(United States) Cigna	(United States) Humana	140.0	147.9	The deal talks ended due to the parties not being able to agree on price. Also governmental antitrust action was a concern.
7	1999	(United States) MCI WorldCom	(United States) Sprint	129.0	249.3	The US Department of Justice and European Commission prohibited the merger on competition grounds, with the DoJ filing a lawsuit against the transaction.
8	2014	(United States) Pfizer	(United Kingdom) Astra Zeneca	123.0	167.3	Significant concerns were raised by the Government of the United Kingdom over job security, in the end leading to a deal being abandoned due to resistance from the AstraZeneca Board.
9	2018	(United States) Broadcom	(United States) Qualcomm	121.0	155.1	Qualcomm claimed that Broadcom had undervalued the business but did propose to meet Broadcom officials, with the initial offer of $121 billion ($140 billion with debt). On February 21, Broadcom reduced their offer to $117 billion in light of Qualcomms increased bid for NXP Semiconductors.
10	2018	(United States) Broadcom	(United States) Qualcomm	117.0	150	On February 21, Broadcom reduced their offer to $117 billion in light of Qualcomms increased bid for NXP Semiconductors. The deal was effectively blocked after US President Donald Trump blocked any deal based upon national security grounds.
11	2009	(United Kingdom) (Australia) BHP Billiton (West Australian Iron Ore Assets)	(United Kingdom) (Australia) Rio Tinto (West Australian Iron Ore Assets)	116.0	174.1	Mining giants Rio Tinto and BHP Billiton abandoned a controversial merger of their Australian iron ore operations after anti-competition complaints from regulators and top customers including China.
12	1999	(United States) MCI WorldCom	(United States) Sprint	111.0	214.5	The Board of Sprint claimed that the first deal undervalued the company and thus rejected the proposal.
13	2025	(United States) Paramount Skydance	(United States) Warner Bros. Discovery	108.4	108.4	Warner Bros. Discovery's board rejected the hostile takeover bid and called it "illusory" as it accused Paramount Skydance of misleading shareholders about its financing.
14	2014	(United States) Pfizer	(United Kingdom) Astra Zeneca	106.0	144.2	AstraZeneca claimed the deal undervalued the company.
15	2018	(United States) Broadcom	(United States) Qualcomm	103.0	132.1	$130 billion with assumed debt ($103 billion without), Qualcomm shareholders would get $60 in cash and $10 per share in Broadcom shares. Qualcomm rejected Broadcom's $103 billion takeover bid, saying the offer “dramatically” undervalued the U.S. company.
16	2006	(United States) Kohlberg Kravis Roberts (United States) Texas Pacific Group	(United States) The Home Depot	100.0	159.7	In a filing with the Securities & Exchange Commission, Home Depot said that its board "unanimously" supports the management team and its current strategy. The potential world record LBO bid never came to fruition after that.
17	2014	(United States) Pfizer	(United Kingdom) Astra Zeneca	98.9	134.5	AstraZeneca claimed the deal undervalued the company.
18	2016	(United States) Honeywell	(United States) United Technologies	90.0	120.7	Honeywell dropped a bid to acquire United Technologies, citing potential regulatory hurdles.
19	2007	(United Kingdom) Barclays	(Netherlands) ABN AMRO	89.6	139.1	Barclays lost out after RBS Group, Fortis, and Banco Santander bid $98 billion with the plan to break ABN AMRO between the three banks.
20	1999	(United States) Pfizer	(United States) Warner-Lambert	82.4	159.3	Pfizer made a hostile bid, just after the announcement of a $65 billion deal with American Home Products, the eventual purchase price would be in excess of $90 billion.
21	1999	(Germany) Deutsche Telekom	(Italy) Telecom Italia	81.0	156.5	Olivetti was able to sway key Telecom Italia shareholders and win control of 51% of shares, killing the proposed merger of the telecommunication giants.
22	2014	(United States) 21st Century Fox	(United States) Time Warner	80.0	108.8	21st Century Fox abandoned its takeover of Time Warner, due to the unwillingness of the Time Warner Board to engage with the Fox executives. This also caused a sharp dip in Fox's stock price which made a deal unattractive to Fox shareholders.
23	1998	(United States) American Home Products	(United Kingdom) SmithKline Beecham	77.0	152.1	The deal was reportedly killed in response to British regulators who feared losing jobs to a proposed U.S. headquarters location.
24	2025	(United States) Netflix, Inc.	(United States) Warner Bros. Discovery (TV, film studios and streaming division)	72.0	72	After Paramount Skydance revised its previously rejected offer from $30 per share to $31 per share and increased the termination fee payable if the deal failed to secure regulatory approval from $5.8 billion to $7 billion, Warner Bros. Discovery said the revised offer was “superior.” Netflix stated, “We’ve always been disciplined, and at the price required to match Paramount Skydance’s latest offer, the deal is no longer financially attractive. As a result, we are declining to match the bid.”
25	2019	(United States) KKR	(United States) Walgreens Boots Alliance	70.0	88.1	KKR did not follow through with a formal bid as the potential world record LBO was simply deemed too large.
26	2021	(United Kingdom) Unilever	(United Kingdom) GlaxoSmithKline (Consumer Health Unit)	68.4	81.3	Unilever made the offer for Glaxo's household brands unit in late 2021 but Glaxo's board and Pfizer, which owns a minority stake in the business, rejected the bid as too low.
27	2009	(Switzerland) Xstrata	(United Kingdom) Anglo American plc	68.0	102	Anglo American rejected rival mining group Xstrata's “merger of equals” proposal, knocking a no-premium marriage and a combination with what it regarded as Xstrata's inferior mines.
28	2004	(United States) Comcast	(United States) Disney	66.0	112.5	Comcast executives abandoned the deal to buy Walt Disney after both investors and Disney executives failed to agree on the acquisition.
29	2026	(United States) Pershing Square Capital Management	(Netherlands) (United States) Universal Music Group	65.03	65	Universal Music Group's board unanimously rejected the unsolicited bid from Bill Ackman's Pershing Square Capital Management saying the deal was not in the best interests of shareholders, artists, or the company. UMG's board stated the proposal "materially undervalues" the company. UMG's largest individual shareholder, Bolloré, had urged the board to reject the offer as well.
30	1999	(United States) Warner–Lambert	(United States) American Home Products	65.0	125.6	Following the merger announcement, Pfizer filed a complaint against Warner-Lambert and initiated an ultimately successful hostile takeover. Pfizer was looking to secure the full rights to Lipitor which was co-marketed with Warner-Lambert.
31	2018	(United States) Comcast	(United States) 21st Century Fox	65.0	83.3	Main Article: Acquisition of 21st Century Fox by Disney
32	2018	(Japan) Takeda Pharmaceutical	(Republic of Ireland) (United Kingdom) Shire	62.5	80.1	Third bid, unanimously rejected by the Shire Board, who concluded that it significantly undervalued the company, its growth prospects as well as pipeline.
33	2018	(Japan) Takeda Pharmaceutical	(Republic of Ireland) (United Kingdom) Shire	62.1	79.6	Fourth bid with enhanced cash component, super-ceded by a fifth bid on April 24.
34	2018	(Japan) Takeda Pharmaceutical	(Republic of Ireland) (United Kingdom) Shire	61.0	78.2	Second bid, unanimously rejected by the Shire Board, who concluded that it significantly undervalued the company, its growth prospects as well as pipeline.
35	2002	(United States) Comcast	(United States) MediaOne	60.0	107.4	Comcast initially bid $60 billion in stock for MediaOne but AT&T trumped them with a better offer of $62 billion in cash and stock.
36	2020	(United States) NextEra Energy	(United States) Duke Energy	60.0	74.6	NextEra Energy approached Duke Energy about a possible merger; however, Duke Energy rejected the bid. Even had Duke Energy accepted, the deal would have been unlikely to close due to regulatory hurdles particularly in the Carolinas, and Florida.
37	2018	(Japan) Takeda Pharmaceutical	(Republic of Ireland) (United Kingdom) Shire	58.2	74.6	First bid, unanimously rejected by the Shire Board, who concluded that it significantly undervalued the company, its growth prospects as well as pipeline.
38	2025	(United States) Paramount Skydance	(United States) Warner Bros. Discovery	57.0	57	Warner Bros. Discovery CEO David Zaslav believed the company was worth $30 per share, or around $70 billion, and convinced the board to reject the bid. Paramount Skydance CEO David Ellison eventually increased his bid.
39	2026	(United States) GameStop	(United States) eBay	56.0	56	GameStop offered a half-cash, half-stock bid for the much larger eBay involving a $20b debt financing commitment from TD Bank. After GameStop CEO Ryan Cohen appeared on CNBC and provided little explanation to the deal's financing, eBay formally rejected the offer as 'neither credible nor attractive'.
40	2007	(Germany) E.ON	(Spain) Endesa	54.0	83.8	Intervention from the Spanish Government delayed the planned takeover and E.ON's offer was eventually trumped by a $65.3 billion deal with Enel and Acciona. The two divested several Spanish assets to E.ON upon completion.
41	2014	(United States) AbbVie	(Republic of Ireland) (United Kingdom) Shire	54.0	73.4	The deal fell through over changes made to tax inversion legislation by the US Government.
42	2014	(Canada) Valeant Pharmaceuticals	(United States) Allergan	54.0	73.4	Allergan argued that the Valeant cash-and-stock offer, would hurt its shareholders, given the Canadian drug-maker's history of cutting research and development spending at companies it acquires. Allergan would be acquired by Actavis and form Allergan.
43	2026	(United States) Advent International (United States) Stripe, Inc.	(United States) PayPal	53.0	53	Advent and Stripe walked away from their joint offer following reports of disagreements over price and regulatory hurdles. Paypal's board also considered the offer inadequate.
44	2017	(United States) Disney	(United States) 21st Century Fox	52.4	68.8	Main Article: Acquisition of 21st Century Fox by Disney
45	1999	(France) Elf Aquitaine	(France) TotalFina	50.0	96.6	After TotalFina's hostile bid for Elf Aquitaine, Elf Aquitaine submitted their own hostile bid for TotalFina. They eventually consummated a 'friendly' merger.
46	2008	(India) Bharti Airtel	(South Africa) MTN Group	50.0	74.8	Bharti called off negotiations after MTN turned Bharti's takeover plan upside down, proposing to take over Bharti instead.
47	2026	(Japan) SoftBank Group	(United States) Switch	50.0	50	Masayoshi Son wished to acquire the energy-efficient data center operator to roll out Stargate AI infrastructure. However, some within SoftBank became wary about the size of the deal and the logistics of running data center campuses from Las Vegas to Atlanta. Son then conceded that a full acquisition was off the table and scrapped a planned January announcement.
48	2024	(Australia) BHP Group Limited	(United Kingdom) Anglo American plc	49.18	50.5	Anglo American rejected the third bid from BHP in a month. The structure of any deal and the fate of Anglo's businesses in South Africa remain big obstacles, with Anglo chairman Stuart Chambers highlighting concerns about completion and execution risks in BHP's proposal.
49	2007	(Canada) Teachers' Private Capital (United States) Providence Equity (United States) Madison Dearborn Partners	(Canada) BCE Inc	48.5	75.3	Due to the tightening of the credit market caused by the subprime mortgage crisis, the investment banks financing the deal – led by Citigroup, Deutsche Bank and the Royal Bank of Scotland – started negotiations on May 16, 2008, to revise the terms of their loans with greater interest rates and greater restrictions to protect themselves. On November 26, 2008, BCE announced that KPMG had informed BCE that it would not be able to issue a statement on the solvency of the company after its privatization, one of the required conditions of the buyout. As a result, the purchase was cancelled.
50	2015	(United States) Anthem	(United States) Cigna	48.0	65.2	The transaction was blocked by US Federal Judges on grounds of diminished competition and the 'irreparable harm' that would be done to the US health insurance market.
51	2008	(United States) Microsoft	(United States) Yahoo!	47.5	71	Yahoo pulled out of talks with Microsoft after they agreed to let Google sell search ads on its site.
52	2015	(United States) Monsanto	(Switzerland) Syngenta	46.5	63.2	Monsanto dropped its hostile bid for Syngenta, refocusing on its five-year plan to double earnings and avoid a backlash from large shareholders. Subsequently, Bayer purchased Monsanto, with ChemChina acquiring Syngenta.
53	2026	(Italy) UniCredit	(Germany) Commerzbank	45.37	45.4	UniCredit, which is the largest shareholder of Commerzbank, made an unsolicited offer to assume complete control of the firm in May 2026. Commerzbank's supervisory and management boards "recommend that shareholders not accept UniCredit's exchange offer," the bank said in a summary of a 137-page analysis of the deal. It said that the offer "does not reflect the fundamental value of Commerzbank" and that it was "vague and entails considerable risks". Commerzbank executives - along with Germany's government and bank employees - have long criticized the tie-up attempt as hostile, recently calling UniCredit's offer "vague and coercive" with "quasi-nil premium".
54	2014	(United States) Comcast	(United States) Time Warner Cable	45.2	61.5	Main Article: Attempted purchase of Time Warner Cable by Comcast
55	1996	(Switzerland) Credit Suisse	Union Bank of Switzerland	45.0	92.4	UBS not only spurned the offer from CS Holding but insisted that it had been "taken aback" by its rival's offer.
56	2000	(United States) General Electric	(United States) Honeywell	45.0	84.1	The EU Competition commission recommended blocking the deal, arguing that the merger would reduce competition – specifically within the aerospace industry – which could end up generating higher prices for consumers.
57	2012	(Netherlands) EADS	(United Kingdom) BAE Systems	45.0	63.1	Lack of investor support, coupled with opposition from the UK Government, German Government and the French Government (which also has a direct holding in EADS).
58	2018	(United States) Qualcomm	(Netherlands) NXP Semiconductors	44.0	56.4	Qualcomm raised their offer from $110 per share to $127.50 per share after pressure from activist investors. In 2018, China failed to approve the merger, leading to its cancellation by Qualcomm on July 26, 2018.
59	2024	(Australia) BHP Group Limited	(United Kingdom) Anglo American plc	42.7	43.8	Anglo American rejected the improved bid saying that it "continues to significantly undervalue".
60	1999	(France) Banque Nationale de Paris	(France) Paribas (France) Société Générale	41.0	79.2	BNP launched a dual bid to create a European super-bank and to break up the planned Paribas-SocGen merger. The three party merger failed after SocGen shareholders did not tender enough shares. Paribas did successfully merge with BNP.
61	2000	(United States) United Technologies	(United States) Honeywell	40.0	74.8	United Technologies ended merger talks with Honeywell after it had emerged that General Electric had dealt a counter-offer.
62	2008	France Télécom	(Sweden) TeliaSonera	40.0	59.8	France Telecom withdrew its bid after the two parties could not reach an agreement on the terms of the deal.
63	2010	(United Kingdom) (Australia) BHP Billiton	(Canada) PotashCorp	40.0	59.1	Potash Corp rejected the offer claiming it undervalued the company.
64	2015	(Israel) Teva Pharmaceutical Industries	(Netherlands) (United States) Mylan	40.0	54.3	In April, Teva offered to acquire Mylan for $40 billion, only a fortnight after Mylan offered to acquire Perrigo for $29 billion. Teva's offer for Mylan was contingent on Mylan abandoning its acquisition of Perrigo. Mylan stated in June 2015 that Teva's disclosure that it had a 1.35 percent stake in Mylan violated US anti-trust rules.
65	2020	(United States) Nvidia Corporation	(Japan) SoftBank Group ( (United Kingdom) Arm Holdings)	40.0	49.8	Nvidia and the Softbank-owned Arm Holdings abandoned the attempted merger due to "significant regulatory challenges" as the US Federal Trade Commission filed a lawsuit to block the merger. Softbank stated that Arm is likely to IPO instead.
66	2026	(United States) Estée Lauder Companies	(Spain) Puig	40.0	40	Estée Lauder and Puig ended merger talks that intended to challenge larger rival L'Oréal. Estée said in a statement the company was focused on continuing to execute its Beauty Reimagined strategy, the turnaround plan under CEO Stephane de La Faverie, aiming to staunch three years of annual sales declines and declining market share. The plan included increased store investment and closing underperforming outlets.
67	2011	(United States) AT&T	(United States) T-Mobile US	39.0	55.8	On August 31, 2011, the Antitrust Division of the United States Department of Justice formally announced that it would seek to block the takeover, and filed a lawsuit to such effect in federal court. Main Article: Attempted purchase of T-Mobile USA by AT&T
68	2019	Hong Kong Exchanges and Clearing	(United Kingdom) London Stock Exchange	39.0	49.1	$39 billion takeover proposal was rejected by the Board of the London Stock Exchange.
69	2024	(Australia) BHP Group Limited	(United Kingdom) Anglo American plc	39.0	40	Anglo American rejected the bid saying that it significantly undervalued the company.
70	2024	(Canada) Alimentation Couche-Tard	(Japan) Seven & i Holdings	38.5	39.5	7-Eleven operator Seven & i said the takeover proposal was not in the best interest of shareholders and was likely to face significant antitrust challenges in the U.S., where the combined company would be the convenience store industry's biggest by a considerable margin.
71	1999	(Bermuda) (United States) Global Crossing	(United States) US West	37.0	71.5	Global Crossing lost out on acquiring US West after Qwest outbid them.
72	2015	(United States) Aetna	(United States) Humana	37.0	50.3	The transaction was blocked by US Federal Judges on grounds of diminished competition and the 'irreparable harm' that would be done to the US health insurance market.
73	2010	(United Kingdom) Prudential	(Hong Kong) AIA Group	35.5	52.4	Prudential tried to lower their bid to $30 billion following shareholder opposition but AIG (then parent of AIA) said they would “not consider” any alterations to the deal. Prudential subsequently withdrew the deal.
74	2014	(United States) Omnicom	(France) Publicis	35.0	47.6	Proposed merger as Publicis Omnicom Group. Omnicom wanted their people to occupy the CEO, CFO and general counsel jobs. Uncertainty over the deal lead to a drop in revenue of $1.5 billion in the period.
75	2019	(United Kingdom) Fiat Chrysler	(France) Renault	35.0	44.1	At the end of May 2019, news broke of a potential $35 billion merger-of-equals between Renault and Fiat Chrysler, aiming to create the third largest car manufacturer. The deal allegedly failed due to Nissan's abstaining from voting on the merger proposal and the French Government's stake in Renault.
76	2020	(United States) Xerox	(United States) HP Inc	35.0	43.5	Xerox's second bid of $35 billion consisting of cash-and-stock saw an increase of $2 per share to buy HP. HP declined and told shareholders it would return $16 billion to shareholders in the next three years to ward off a hostile takeover attempt.
77	1998	(United States) American Home Products	(United States) Monsanto	34.4	68	The companies said that the deal was abandoned because it was not in the best interest of the shareholders. Yet, people close to the deal said the merger was terminated because of the power struggle between the two companies’ chairmen.
78	1999	Bank of Scotland	(United Kingdom) NatWest	34.3	66.3	NatWest rejected the deal saying that it undervalued the company. They would end up being acquired by The Royal Bank of Scotland Group for $42.5 billion.
79	2018	(United States) Comcast	(United Kingdom) Sky	34.0	43.6	Comcast offered £17.28 per share, exceeding Fox's offer of £15.67 per share, in a blind auction set up by the UK's Takeover Panel.
80	2021	(Canada) Canadian National Railway	(United States) Kansas City Southern	33.6	39.9	After US regulators rejected a key aspect of the proposed deal, Kansas City Southern notified Canadian National Railway that they were going to terminate the agreement. Kansas City Southern accepted Canadian Pacific Railway's revised offer of $31 billion which had previously been rejected in favor of the Canadian National Railway bid.
81	2019	(United States) Xerox	(United States) HP Inc	33.5	42.2	Xerox's $33.5 billion (£25.8 billion) cash-and-stock offer to buy bigger rival HP was declined, with HP indicating it might make its own counter-offer for Xerox.
82	1994	(United States) Bell Atlantic	(United States) Tele-Communications Inc	33.0	71.7	The companies blamed the deal's collapse on the FCC which voted to reduce cable television rates against the protests of the cable TV industry. The FCC denied this vehemently with an FCC commissioner James Quello saying “They [Bell Atlantic] may be paying too much for it [TCI].”
83	2016	(United States) Energy Transfer Equity	(United States) Williams Companies	33.0	44.3	Energy Transfer Equity terminated the merger agreement with Williams after ETE's counsel were unable to declare the deal as tax-free.
84	2019	(United States) Chevron Corporation	(United States) Anadarko Petroleum	33.0	41.6	On April 12, Chevron Corporation announced it would acquire Anadarko for $33 billion ($65 per share, 25% in cash, $50 billion including debt). However, on April 24, Occidental Petroleum announced a counter-offer to Chevron's previous announcement, offering $38 billion ($76 per share, 50% in cash, $57 billion including debt) – Occidental's offer would ultimately prove successful.
85	2018	(United States) 21st Century Fox	(United Kingdom) Sky	32.5	41.7	Fox raised their offer to $32.5 billion for Sky.
86	2016	(Germany) Deutsche Börse	(United Kingdom) London Stock Exchange Group	31.0	41.6	The merger was prohibited on competition grounds by the EU Commission.
87	2018	(United States) Comcast	(United Kingdom) Skyc	31.0	39.7	Comcast offered $31 billion for Sky which Fox trumped.
88	2021	(Canada) Canadian Pacific Railway	(United States) Kansas City Southern	31.0	36.8	Kansas City Southern rejected the bid as the Canadian National Railway bid was still the superior offer.
89	2000	(Germany) Deutsche Bank	(Germany) Dresdner Bank	30.0	56.1	Dresdner Bank abandoned the deal when the two couldn't agree on what to do with Dresdner's investment bank. Deutsche Bank wanted to sell most of it, but Dresdner did not want that to happen.
90	2020	(United Kingdom) Aon plc	(United Kingdom) Willis Towers Watson	30.0	37.3	Aon and Willis Towers Watson called off their merger after reaching an impasse with US regulators.
91	2006	(United Kingdom) Aviva	(United Kingdom) Prudential	29.6	47.3	Aviva's all-stock proposal was rejected by the Prudential Board, despite Aviva offering a premium to the current share price.
92	2017	(United States) PPG Industries	(Netherlands) Akzo Nobel	29.5	38.7	Akzo again rejected PPG's bid, citing the deal still undervalued the company, as well as potentially facing antitrust risks, and not addressing other concerns such as "cultural differences".
93	2004	(Japan) Sumitomo Mitsui Financial Group	(Japan) UFJ Bank	29.2	49.8	UFJ Bank rejected the proposal as it had already committed to a merger with Mitsubishi Tokyo Financial Group.
94	2017	(United States) Emerson Electric	(United States) Rockwell Automation	29.0	38.1	Rejected as Rockwell believed the offer still undervalued the company.
95	1997	(United States) GTE	(United States) MCI	28.0	56.2	GTE made an unsolicited offer of $28 billion all-cash to MCI two weeks after Worldcom bid $30 billion in stock. Worldcom would end up winning with a $37 billion bid.
96	2001	(United Kingdom) Lloyds TSB Group	(United Kingdom) Abbey National	28.0	50.9	The British Government blocked the proposed merger as they believed it would be against the public interest.
97	2005	(Spain) Gas Natural	(Spain) Endesa	28.0	46.2	Endesa rejected the bid saying it was "manifestly insufficient". Endesa would be acquired for $65.3 billion by Enel and Acciona.
98	2016	(Canada) Canadian Pacific	(United States) Norfolk Southern	28.0	37.6	Canadian Pacific Railway scrapped the deal after the U.S. Justice Department urged the Surface Transportation Board to reject a voting trust arrangement that was part of the bid. U.S. lawmakers, the U.S. military, and UPS and FedEx all opposed the merger as well.
99	2016	(United States) Halliburton	(United States) Baker Hughes	28.0	37.6	Oilfield services provider Halliburton and smaller rival Baker Hughes terminated their $28 billion merger deal after opposition from U.S. and European antitrust regulators.
100	2007	(United States) Alcoa	(Canada) Alcan	27.6	42.9	Alcan rejected the offer as they believed it did not reflect the full value of the company and advised shareholders not to tender any of their shares to the bid.
101	2017	(United States) Emerson Electric	(United States) Rockwell Automation	27.6	36.3	Rejected as Rockwell believed the offer undervalued the company. The $27.6 billion was made up of $107.50 per share in cash with the rest of the balance being paid in 225 million shares of Emerson stock.
102	2026	(South Africa) Gold Fields	(Australia) Northern Star Resources	27.1	27.1	Australia's top gold producer Northern Star Resources said it rejected an unsolicited A$38.7 billion ($27.1 billion) takeover proposal from South Africa's Gold Fields.
103	2001	(United Kingdom) Prudential	(United States) American General	26.5	48.2	Prudential's bid of $26.5 billion in stock was reduced to just over $20 billion when Prudential's shares plummeted after the announcement. AIG then stepped in and offered $23 billion which was accepted by American General.
104	2017	(United States) PPG Industries	(Netherlands) Akzo Nobel	26.1	34.3	Akzo rejected the unsolicited offer, claiming the revised offer was still too low. Akzo claimed that key stakeholder issues as well as uncertainties and risks that had already been raised in response to earlier offers had not been answered.
105	2007	(United States) Express Scripts	(United States) Caremark Rx	26.0	40.4	Express Scripts bid $26 billion for Caremark Rx but refused to pay a $675 million breakup fee to void Caremark's pending merger with CVS. Even though Express Scripts offered $4 billion more than CVS, CVS and Caremark Rx completed their merger.
106	2015	(Netherlands) (United States) Mylan	(Republic of Ireland) (United States) Perrigo	26.0	35.3	In order for the hostile takeover to go through successfully, Mylan needed 50% of Perrigos shares to be tendered under the deal. However, only 40% or 58 million shares were tendered and the hostile takeover fell through.
107	2002	(United States) Hughes Electronics	(United States) EchoStar	25.6	45.8	US and state anti-trust enforcers filed a lawsuit to halt the deal, claiming that the deal would eliminate competition and adversely effect consumers.
108	2013	(United States) Dish Network	(United States) Sprint Corporation	25.5	35.2	Sprint requested a revised offer but Dish stated that it was not practical to do so.
109	2004	(United States) Johnson & Johnson	(United States) Guidant	25.4	43.3	Johnson & Johnson announced that it was acquiring Guidant on December 15, 2004, for $76 a share, with the deal being approved on April 27, 2005, by Guidant shareholders. However, on May 25 of the same year, Guidant reported 26 cases of implantable defibrillator failure, including a death. Johnson & Johnson announced the possibility of them pulling out from the deal, Guidant then sued Johnson & Johnson in an attempt to enforce the acquisition. However, they later re-negotiated a lower price of $21.5 billion.
110	2006	(United States) Boston Scientific	(United States) Guidant	25.0	39.9	A day after Johnson & Johnson raised their price for Guidant to $23.2 billion, Boston Scientific announced a further increased offer.
111	2007	(United States) J.C. Flowers & Co. (United States) Friedman Fleischer & Lowe (United States) Bank of America (United States) JPMorgan Chase & Co.	(United States) Sallie Mae	25.0	38.8	Sallie Mae attempted to craft an "alternative transaction" but the proposal was rejected. Subsequently, the takeover was dropped.
112	2013	(United States) The Blackstone Group	(United States) Dell	25.0	34.6	Blackstone noted in a letter to Dell's special committee that a "unprecedented 14 percent market decline in PC volume in the first quarter of 2013" worried the firm and didn't line up with Dell's projections for modest industry growth. In addition, Blackstone's evaluation of Dell showed a "rapidly eroding financial profile." Blackstone subsequently withdrew their bid.
113	2021	(Switzerland) Chubb	(United States) The Hartford	25.0	29.7	The Hartford rejected two enhanced buyout offers.
114	2022	(United States) Kroger	(United States) Albertsons	25.0	27.5	After a three-week trial, U.S. District Judge Adrienne Nelson sided with the Federal Trade Commission and ruled that the merger was likely to remove direct competition between the two grocers, making it unlawful. The two companies subsequently called off the deal.
115	2005	(United States) Boston Scientific	(United States) Guidant	24.6	40.6	With the re-negotiated lower price of $21.5 billion between Johnson & Johnson and Guidant, Boston Scientific announced an unsolicited offer of $24.6 billion for Guidant (an offer of $72 per share of Guidant, $36 in cash and a fixed number of Boston Scientific shares valued at $36 a share).
116	2006	(United States) Johnson & Johnson	(United States) Guidant	24.2	38.6	After Boston Scientific increased their offer to $25 billion, Johnson & Johnson further increased their offer to $24.2 billion.
117	2017	(United States) PPG Industries	(Netherlands) Akzo Nobel	24.1	31.7	Akzo rejected the unsolicited offer, claiming the revised offer was still too low.
118	1998	(United States) Bank of New York	(United States) Mellon Bank Corporation	24.0	47.4	Bank of New York called off its takeover proposal after Mellon's Board declined to meet with Bank of New York officials to discuss the merger. The two would later merge in 2007.
119	2018	(United States) Albertsons	(United States) Rite Aid	24.0	30.8	Albertsons and Rite Aid called off the planned merger after several advisory firms recommended voting against the proposal.
120	2021	(Switzerland) Chubb	(United States) The Hartford	23.9	28.4	The Hartford rejected two enhanced buyout offers.
121	2022	(United States) Prologis	(United States) Duke Realty	23.7	26.1	Duke Realty rejected the offer calling it "insufficient" despite being Prologis' third bid.
122	1988	(United States) First Boston (United States) Pritzker family (United States) Philip Anschutz	(United States) RJR Nabisco	23.38	63.6	The group's final bid was beat out by Kohlberg Kravis Roberts.
123	2021	(Switzerland) Chubb	(United States) The Hartford	23.24	27.6	The Hartford's board of directors unanimously rejected the unsolicited proposed takeover from Chubb stating that the transaction would "not be in the best interests of the company and its shareholders."
124	2006	(United States) Johnson & Johnson	(United States) Guidant	23.2	37.1	After the re-negotiated lower price of $21.5 billion was trumped by Boston Scientific's offer of $24.6 billion, Johnson & Johnson raised their offer to $23.2 billion.
125	2016	(United States) Mondelez International	(United States) The Hershey Company	23.0	30.9	Mondelez ceased its pursuit of the Hershey Co acquisition after the chocolate company turned down its $23 billion cash-and-stock offer.
126	2024	(United States) Alphabet	(United States) Wiz	23.0	23.6	Wiz ended takeover talks, instead choosing to focus on an IPO. Wiz CEO Assaf Rappaport said, "Saying no to such humbling offers is tough, but with our exceptional team, I feel confident in making that choice."
127	1988	(United States) Shearson Lehman Hutton (Canada) F. Ross Johnson	(United States) RJR Nabisco	22.9	62.3	The group's final bid was beat out by Kohlberg Kravis Roberts.
128	1995	(United States) Tracinda	(United States) Chrysler	22.8	48.2	Tracinda, led by Kirk Kerkorian, was unable to come up with the financing in order to complete the deal. Chrysler was able to leverage its relationships with investment banks to block Kerkorian from being able to get the money necessary for the takeover.
129	2023	(Switzerland) Glencore	(Canada) Teck Resources	22.5	23.8	Copper and zinc miner Teck Resources rejected an unsolicited bid from Glencore, citing a reluctance to expose its shareholders to thermal coal, oil, LNG, and related sectors.
130	1996	(United Kingdom) British Telecom	(United States) MCI	22.0	45.2	British Telecom held a partial stake in MCI since 1994 and was looking to acquire the entirety of it. Worldcom ended up winning the takeover fight with a $37 billion bid.
131	2020	(Japan) Seven & i Holdings	(United States) Marathon Petroleum ( (United States) Speedway)	22.0	27.4	Seven & i and Marathon agreed to a price of $21 billion, after 5 months of baulking at the deal.
132	2021	(United States) DraftKings	(Isle of Man) Entain	22.0	26.1	Neither DraftKings nor Entain explained exactly why the deal talks floundered but said in separate statements that they believed strongly in their individual growth prospects. The potential deal was likely hindered by Entain's joint venture with MGM, BetMGM.
133	2007	(United States) Vornado Realty Trust (United States) Starwood Capital Group (United States) Walton Street Capital	(United States) Equity Office	21.6	33.5	The Vornado-led takeover attempt failed after a better bid came from The Blackstone Group.
134	2007	(United Kingdom) Terra Firma Capital Partners (United Kingdom) Wellcome Trust (United Kingdom) HBOS	(United Kingdom) Alliance Boots	21.6	33.5	The Terra Firma-led takeover attempt failed after a better bid came from a group led by Kohlberg Kravis Roberts.
135	1989	(France) (United Kingdom) James Goldsmith (United Kingdom) Jacob Rothschild (Australia) Kerry Packer	(United Kingdom) British American Tobacco	21.0	54.5	British American Tobacco rejected the deal as it planned to break up the conglomerate which the company's chairman Patrick Sheehy described as “most disadvantageous to the company, its shareholders, customers, policyholders and employees.”
136	2014	(France) Bouygues	(France) SFR	20.6	28	Bouygues offer was soon trumped by Numericable's, who purchased SFR for $23 billion.
137	2017	(Germany) Hochtief	(Spain) Abertis	20.1	26.4	Hochtief launched a bid to rival a lesser one from Atlantia. However, soon after Atlantia and Hochtief's parent company, ACS Group, succeeded in the takeover with a joint bid.
138	2007	(Luxembourg) CVC Capital Partners	(United Kingdom) Sainsbury's	20.0	31.1	The proposed offer collapsed because of CVC's failure to broker an agreement with the Sainsbury family, owners of a nearly 20% stake, and trustees who demanded it fill a billion pound pension deficit.
139	2017	(Switzerland) Clariant	(United States) Huntsman	20.0	26.3	After months of pressure from activist investors, the companies announced they would abandon their merger plans, with investors citing a reduction in shareholder value as the cause.
140	2020	(United States) Blackstone Inc (United States) Global Infrastructure Partners	(United States) Kansas City Southern	20.0	24.9	Kansas City Southern rejected the $20 billion offer from a consortium led by Blackstone Inc and Global Infrastructure Partners.
141	2021	(Canada) Alimentation Couche-Tard	(France) Carrefour	20.0	23.8	The two abandoned talks on the proposed merger following stiff opposition from the French finance minister.
142	2021	(Luxembourg) CVC Capital Partners	(Japan) Toshiba	20.0	23.8	A notice for shareholders said the buyout offer "was not, objectively viewed, a bona-fide and feasible acquisition proposal" under Japanese regulations. Toshiba therefore sent CVC a "please explain" letter to seek more information. Toshiba said CVC's reply "contained no specific and detailed information capable of detailed evaluation."
143	2022	(United States) Adobe	(United States) Figma	20.0	22	The two companies abandoned the deal, with Adobe stating that there was "no clear path to receive regulatory approvals from the European Commission and the UK Competition and Markets Authority."

== See also ==
- List of largest companies by revenue
- List of largest media and entertainment mergers and acquisitions
- List of largest video game mergers and acquisitions
- List of largest corporate profits and losses
- List of largest corporate spin-offs
- List of largest employers
- List of largest pharmaceutical mergers and acquisitions
- List of public corporations by market capitalization
