= List of largest corporate spin-offs =

The following table lists the largest ever corporate spin-offs.

Rank	Year	Divestor	Spin-off entity	Transaction value (in billions USD)	Inflation adjusted (in billions 2022 USD)	Ref
1	2024	(United States) General Electric Company	(United States) GE Aerospace, GE Vernova, GE Healthcare	191	191	
2	2008	(United States) Altria Group	(United States) Philip Morris International	108	141	
3	2000	(Canada) BCE	(Canada) Nortel	60	97	
4	2013	(United States) Abbott Laboratories	(United States) AbbVie	56	67	
5	2015	(United States) eBay	(United States) PayPal	49	58	
6	2007	(United States) Altria	(United States) Kraft Foods	46	62	
7	2001	(United States) AT&T	(United States) Liberty Media Corporation	42	66	
8	2015	(Hong Kong) CK Hutchison Holdings	(Hong Kong) Cheung Kong Property Holdings	37	43	
9	2006	(United States) Viacom	(United States) Viacom Inc., CBS Corporation	32	44	
10	1999	(United States) Hewlett-Packard	(United States) Agilent Technologies	30	50	
11	2012	(United States) Kraft Foods Inc	(United States) Kraft Foods Group Inc, Mondelez International	27	33	

== See also ==
- List of largest companies by revenue
- List of companies by employees
- List of companies by profit and loss
- List of public corporations by market capitalization
- List of largest pharmaceutical mergers and acquisitions
- List of largest mergers and acquisitions
