= Angus Russell =

British businessman (born 1956)

- Born: Angus C. Russell; 2 January 1956 (age 70)
- Occupation: Businessman
- Years active: 1977–present
- Title: Former chief executive of Shire plc
- Term: 2008–2013
- Predecessor: Matthew Emmens
- Successor: Flemming Ørnskov

Angus C. Russell (born 2 January 1956) is a British businessman. He was the chief executive (CEO) of Shire plc, a multinational speciality biopharmaceutical manufacturing company, from 2008 to 2013.

== Early life ==
Russell qualified as a chartered accountant with Coopers & Lybrand and is a fellow of the Association of Corporate Treasurers.

== Career ==
Russell was appointed as the chief executive officer of Shire plc on 18 June 2008, taking over from Matthew Emmens, who became the non-executive chairman.

Russell was the chief financial officer of Shire from 1999 to 2008, and its principal accounting officer and executive vice president of global finance. Prior to joining Shire, Russell worked at ICI, Zeneca and AstraZeneca for 19 years, most recently as vice president of corporate finance at AstraZeneca plc.

On 30 April 2013, Flemming Ørnskov of Bayer took over as CEO.

== Personal life ==
His wife lives in Montreal, Quebec, Canada.
