= Galderma =

Swiss pharmaceutical company

Galderma S.A.
- Type: Public
- Traded as: SIX: GALD
- Industry: Dermatology; Pharmaceuticals
- Founded: 1981; 45 years ago (as a joint venture between L'Oréal and Nestlé)
- Headquarters: Zug, Switzerland
- Key people: Flemming Ørnskov (CEO); Thomas Ebeling (chairman)
- Revenue: ▲US$4.41 billion (2024)
- Owner: Consortium led by EQT AB (2019–2024); Nestle (1981–2019); L'Oréal (1981–2014)
- Number of employees: 6,500 (2024)
- Website: galderma.com

Galderma S.A. is a Swiss pharmaceutical company based in Zug that specializes in dermatological treatments and skin care products. Formerly a subsidiary of L'Oréal and Nestlé, it was acquired by a consortium of private institutional investors in 2019 and remained under their ownership until its initial public offering in 2024. It has been a component of the Swiss Market Index since September 2026.

Galderma was formed in 1981 as a joint venture between Nestlé and L'Oréal, and later became a wholly owned subsidiary of Nestlé. The company, headed by president and CEO Flemming Ørnskov (ex-Shire), has 33 sites in 100 countries with a worldwide network of distributors and employs more than 4,600 people.

== History ==
The origins of Galderma date back to 1961 and the founding of the Owen dermatology company in Dallas, Texas, US, by M. Owen.

In 1979, Hans Schaefer founded the International Center for Dermatological Research (CIRD) in Sophia Antipolis, with the support of the CEO of L'Oréal, François Dalle, who wanted to diversify his cosmetic research into the drug sector. At the same time, Nestlé, which also had ambitions in dermatology bought the Owen laboratory.

L'Oréal and Nestlé formed a joint venture in 1981 and created Galderma (CIRD became Galderma R&D).

Galderma expanded by specializing in the research, development, and commercialization of products for dermatology (skincare) patients. It reached a significant size, with 38 subsidiaries present in 100 countries in the 2010s. It diversified into aesthetic medicine products with the botulinum toxin Azzalure, a field in which it strengthened in 2010 with the acquisition of the Swedish medical device company Q-Med.

Nestlé bought back all the shares from L'Oréal in 2014, creating a new unit of Nestlé group called Nestlé Skin Health. The transaction had a value of €3.1 billion (US$4.23 billion) and was paid for by Nestlé with 21.2 million L'Oréal shares.

In 2019, Nestlé sold Galderma for $10.2 billion to a consortium comprising the EQT VIII fund, Luxinva (a wholly owned subsidiary of Abu Dhabi Investment Authority), PSP Investments and other institutional investors. Since then, it has been the largest independent dermatology company in the world.

Galderma bought California-based Alastin, a firm specializing in specialist skincare products, for an undisclosed price in November 2021.

In June 2022, Galderma announced positive results in two Phase III trials for liquid botulinum toxin A, showing RelabotulinumtoxinA was well tolerated. The company also accounted positive data from the Phase III trial, showing the efficacy and safety of Nemolizumab in patients with prurigo nodularis at the 2023 European Academy of Dermatology and Venereology congress in Berlin. Nemolizumab is a monoclonal antibody that blocks the signaling of IL-31, a neuroimmune cytokine involved in the pathogenesis of prurigo nodularis.

On 6 March 2023, Galderma announced its intention to list on the Swiss stock exchange.

The IPO took place on 22 March 2024 and was one of the biggest in Europe in two years and the largest in Switzerland since 2017. The stock price went up to 62,68 Swiss francs, up from the IPO price at 53 francs per share. The company will repay debt with offering proceeds.

== Activities ==
Galderma provides a range of over-the-counter and prescription dermatological products for skin care, aesthetics and treatment of conditions including acne, rosacea, psoriasis and other steroid-responsive dermatoses (SRD), onychomycosis (fungal nail infections), pigmentary disorders, skin cancer and skin aging. Galderma's activities are divided into three business units: aesthetics, consumer care, and prescription medicine. Galderma's products are sold in more than 100 countries.

=== Aesthetics ===
In 2007, Galderma and Ipsen signed a licensing agreement for the distribution of the botulinum toxin Dysport, known as Azzalure in the European Union. More than 40 million treatments have been performed in the United States and the European Union.

The main brands are Restylane, Azzalure, Dysport, Alluzience, Sculptra and Relfydess (relabotulinumtoxinA), which received a positive decision for use in Australia and in the European Union in July 2024.

=== Consumer care ===
Some of Galderma's products are available over-the-counter to consumers. Their main consumer care brands are Cetaphil, with its range of skin care products for all ages; Benzac (benzoyl peroxide) and Differin OTC for mild-to-moderate acne; Loceryl, used to treat fungal infections of the nails; and Alastin Skincare, a line of products marketed to improve the results of dermatologic procedures as well as daily "anti-aging" skincare.

=== Prescription Medicine ===
Disease areas are atopic dermatitis, dermato-oncology and psoriasis.

The main brands are Aklief, Cetaphil, Epiduo, Epiduo Forte, Twyneo (tretinoin/benzoyl peroxide), Epsolay (benzoyl peroxide), Loceryl, Soolantra (ivermectin), Mirvaso (used to treat rosacea, Oracea (doxycycline), Metvix and Nemluvio (emolizumab) which received US Food and Drug Administration approval for adult patients living with prurigo nodularis in August 2024 and for patients with atopic dermatitis in December 2024.

== Research and development ==
The company invests substantially in research and development and sources new treatments from its own activities and from its partnerships with others. It divides its research and development departments between six sites:

- Lausanne, Switzerland
- Zug, Switzerland
- Sophia Antipolis, France
- Uppsala, Sweden
- Dallas, Texas
- Bridgewater, New Jersey
- Baie-D'Urfé, Canada

== Production ==
Galderma has manufacturing facilities at the following locations:

- The Alby-sur-Chéran plant in France, inaugurated in 1994, supplies over 70 countries.
- The Baie d'Urfé (Montreal) facility in Canada started production in 2000 and supplies Cetaphil globally.
- The plant in Uppsala, Sweden, manufactures aesthetic and corrective products.
- The Hortolândia site in the state of São Paulo, Brazil serves South America.

== Governance ==
- Flemming Ørnskov, chief executive officer
- Thomas Dittrich chief financial officer
- Adrian Murphy, head of global operations
- Allison Pinkham, chief human resources officer

== See also ==
- List of pharmaceutical companies
- Pharmaceutical industry in Switzerland
