= Harry Stratford =

British businessman

Harry Thomas Stratford OBE (born 1948) is the founder of Shire, one of the United Kingdom's largest pharmaceutical businesses.

== Career ==
Educated at the University of London, Harry Stratford founded Shire Pharmaceuticals in 1986 and remained its Chief Executive until 1994.

In 1995 he founded ProStakan, another pharmaceutical business, and was Chief Executive there until he became Executive Chairman in 2004; he was then Non-Executive Chairman from 2006 until he retired at the end of 2007. In 2008 he became a Non-Executive Director of Merrion Pharmaceuticals.

He was appointed an Officer of the Order of the British Empire in the 2007 New Year Honours.
