= Flemming Ørnskov =

Danish pharmaceutical executive (born 1958)

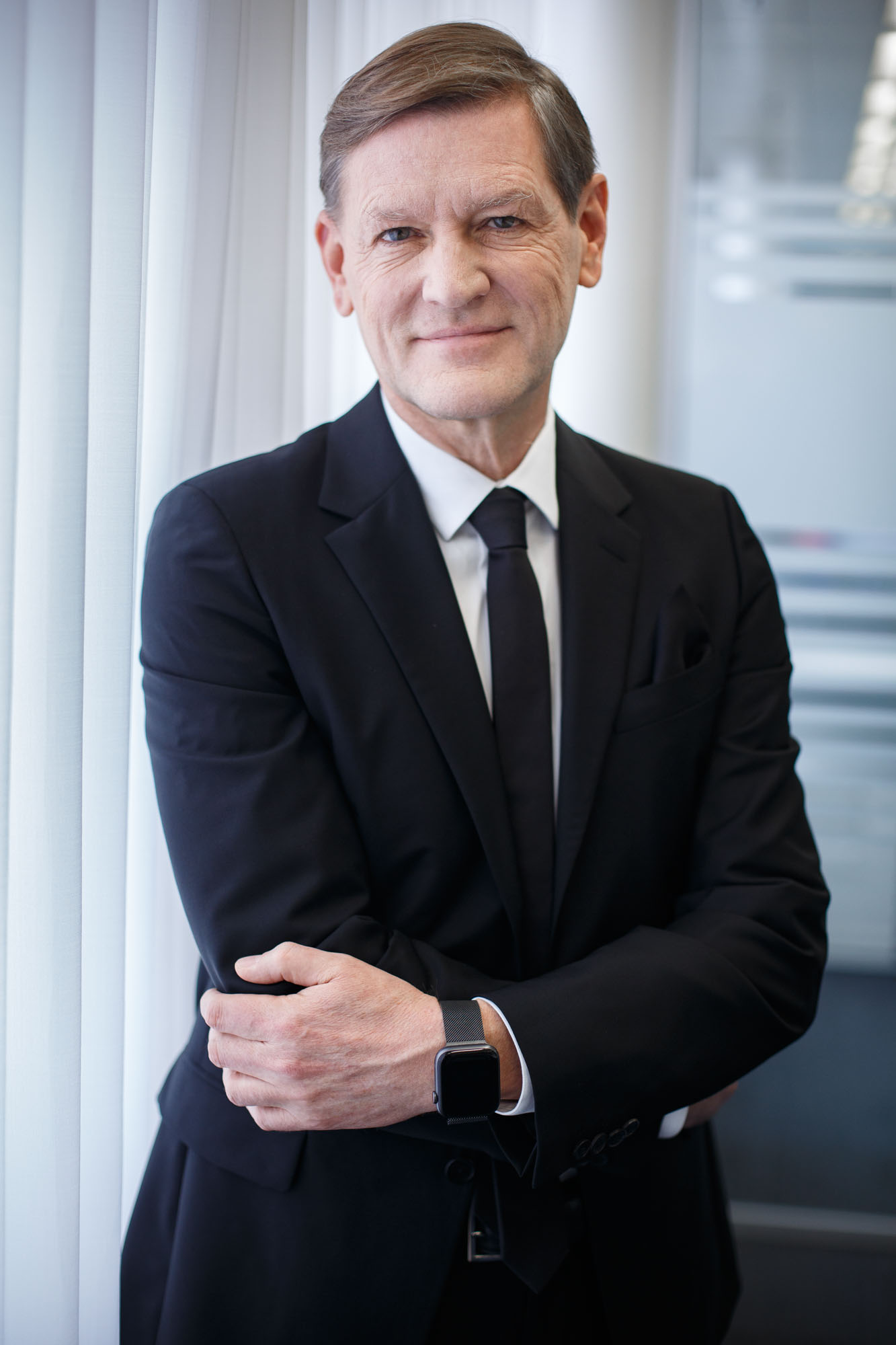
- Born: 24 January 1958 (age 68); Esbjerg, Denmark
- Education: University of Copenhagen; INSEAD; Harvard University
- Occupations: CEO, Galderma
- Children: 4

Flemming Ørnskov (born 24 January 1958) is a Danish businessman. He has been the chief executive officer (CEO) of Galderma since October 2019.

He was previously the CEO of Shire plc, a FTSE 100 specialty biopharmaceutical company as of 30 April 2013, succeeding Angus Russel. He previously worked for Bayer, Bausch & Lomb and Novartis.

He is also the non-executive chairman of Waters Corporation, a position he's been holding since 2017.

Ørnskov was educated at the Esbjerg Gymnasium. He received his MD from the University of Copenhagen, followed by an MBA from INSEAD, and a Master of Public Health (MPH) from Harvard University. Ørnskov is qualified as a doctor in Denmark and has experience as a practicing hospital physician.

Ørnskov led Galderma's IPO on the Zurich stock exchange on March 22, 2024, one of the biggest offerings in Europe in years and the biggest in Switzerland since 2017. He declares Galderma plans to use the proceeds to pay down debt and invest in its pipeline.

Ørnskov is married to a German management consultant, with whom he has two sons. He has one son and a daughter from a previous marriage.

== Awards ==
Top 100 Best-Performing CEOs in the World, 2015 - Harvard Business Review

Top 25 Most Influential People in Biopharma Today, 2013 - Fierce Biotech
