= Cetaphil =

Skin care product line

- Type: Brand
- Industry: Consumer goods
- Founded: 1947
- Headquarters: Fort Worth, Texas, United States
- Products: Skincare
- Parent: Galderma Laboratories; Nestlé (former)
- Website: cetaphil.com

Cetaphil /ˈsiːtəfɪl/ or /ˈsɛtəfɪl/ is a line of skin care products from the Swiss company Galderma, including cleansers, bar soap, cream, lotion, and moisturizers. It was developed in 1947 in Texas and it is sold at grocery stores and pharmacies across the United States, Canada, India, and Nepal. Cetaphil products are also available in pharmacies in approximately 100 countries including in Australia, Hong Kong, South Korea, Indonesia, the Philippines, South Africa, Singapore, and some European, Latin American and Caribbean countries.

Prior to a change in formulation, Cetaphil cleanser ingredients were water, cetyl alcohol, propylene glycol, sodium lauryl sulfate, stearyl alcohol, methylparaben, propylparaben, butylparaben. However, in 2021 Cetaphil changed its formula, adding several new ingredients including niacinamide, panthenol, and glycerin. In October of 2022, Cetaphil updated their logo.
