= List of largest pharmaceutical mergers and acquisitions =

The following table lists the largest mergers and acquisitions in the pharmaceutical and biotechnology industry (those over $10 billion). Transactions are recorded by the highest transaction dollar value (rather than using the inflation adjusted values).

== Largest mergers and acquisitions ==
This list is incomplete, you can help by expanding it

R	Year	Purchaser	Target	Transaction type	Value — with debt (in billions USD)	Value — with debt (adjusted for inflation)	Ref
1	1999	(United States) Pfizer	(United States) Warner-Lambert	Acquisition	111.8	216	
2	2000	(United Kingdom) Glaxo Wellcome plc	(United Kingdom) SmithKline Beecham	Merger (formed GlaxoSmithKline)	76.0	142	
3	2019	(United States) Bristol-Myers Squibb	(United States) Celgene	Acquisition	74.0 — 95.0	93 — 120	
3	2004	(France) Sanofi	(France) Aventis	Acquisition	73.5	110	
4	2015	(Republic of Ireland) Actavis	(United States) Allergan, Inc	Acquisition	70.5	96	
5	2009	(United States) Pfizer	(United States) Wyeth	Acquisition	68.0	102	
6	2002	(United States) Pfizer	(United Kingdom) Pharmacia	Acquisition	64.3	115	
7	2020	(United States) AbbVie	(United States) Allergan	Acquisition	63.0	78	
8	2018	(Japan) Takeda Pharmaceutical	(Republic of Ireland) Shire	Acquisition	62.0	79	
9	2016	(Germany) Bayer	(United States) Monsanto	Acquisition	54.5 — 63.5	73 — 85	
10	2009	(United States) Merck & Co.	(United States) Schering-Plough	Acquisition	47.1	71	
11	2009	(Switzerland) Roche	(United States) Genentech	Acquisition	44.0	66	
12	2014	(Republic of Ireland) Medtronic	(Republic of Ireland) Covidien	Acquisition	42.3	58	
13	2015	(Israel) Teva Pharmaceutical Industries	(United States) Actavis	Business Unit	40.5	55	
14	2010	(Switzerland) Novartis	(United States) Alcon	Acquisition	39.3	58	
15	2016	(Republic of Ireland) Shire	(United States) Baxalta	Acquisition Unit	32.0 — 35.0	43 — 47	
16	2016	(United States) Abbott Laboratories	(United States) St Jude Medical	Acquisition	30.5	41	
17	1998	(Sweden) Astra AB	(United Kingdom) Zeneca	Merger (formed AstraZeneca)	30.4	60	
18	2017	(United States) Johnson & Johnson	(Switzerland) Actelion	Acquisition	30.0	39	
19	1996	(Switzerland) Ciba-Geigy	(Switzerland) Sandoz	Merger (formed Novartis)	29.0	60	
20	2006	(United States) Boston Scientific (United States) Abbott Laboratories	(United States) Guidant	Acquisition	27.2	43	
21	1999	(United Kingdom) Pharmacia & Upjohn	(United States) Monsanto	Merger	25.2	49	
22	2016	(United States) Abbott Laboratories	(United States) St Jude Medical	Acquisition	25.0 — 30.5	34 — 41	
23	2015	(United States) AbbVie	(United States) Pharmacyclics	Acquisition	21.0	29	
24	2014	(Republic of Ireland) Actavis	(United States) Forest Laboratories	Acquisition	20.7	28	
25	2011	(France) Sanofi	(United States) Genzyme Corporation	Acquisition	20.1	29	
26	2012	(United States) Johnson & Johnson	(Switzerland) Synthes	Acquisition	19.7	28	
27	2006	(Germany) Bayer	(Germany) Schering	Acquisition	18.4	29	
28	2016	(United States) Quintiles	(United States) IMS Health	Merger (formed QuintilesIMS)	17.6	24	
29	2015	(United States) Pfizer	(United States) Hospira	Acquisition	17.0	23	
30	2014	(Germany) Merck Group	(United States) Sigma-Aldrich	Acquisition	17.0	23	
31	2001	(United States) Amgen	(United States) Immunex	Acquisition	16.8	31	
32	2006	(United States) Johnson & Johnson	(United States) Pfizer Consumer Health	Business Unit	16.6	27	
33	2024	(Denmark) Novo Holdings A/S	(United States) Catalent	Acquisition	16.5	17	
34	2014	(Switzerland) Novartis	(United Kingdom) GlaxoSmithKline Oncology	Business Unit	16.0	22	
35	2015	(United States) Valeant	(United States) Salix Pharmaceuticals	Acquisition	15.8	21	
36	2007	(United Kingdom) AstraZeneca	(United States) MedImmune	Acquisition	14.7	23	
37	2007	(United States) Schering Plough	(United States) Organon International	Acquisition	14.5	23	
38	1995	(United Kingdom) Glaxo	(United Kingdom) Wellcome	Acquisition	14.2	30	
39	2014	(Germany) Bayer	(United States) Merck & Co Consumer Health	Business Unit	14.2	19	
40	2014	(United States) Zimmer Inc.	(United States) Biomet Inc.	Acquisition	13.4	18	
41	2019	(United States) Amgen	(United States) Otezla (drug programme)	Acquisition	13.4	17	
42	2006	(Germany) Merck Group	(Switzerland) Serono	Acquisition	13.2	21	
43	2018	(United Kingdom) GlaxoSmithKline	(United Kingdom) (Switzerland) GlaxoSmithKline–Novartis Consumer Healthcare	Acquisition	13.0	17	
44	2016	(Germany) Boehringer Ingelheim	(France) Sanofi Animal Health (Merial)	Business Unit	12.4	17	
45	2017	(United States) Gilead Sciences	(United States) Kite Pharma	Acquisition	11.9	16	
46	2018	(France) Sanofi	(United States) Bioverativ	Acquisition	11.6	15	
47	2011	(United States) Gilead Sciences	(United States) Pharmasset	Acquisition	11.2	16	
48	2013	(United States) Amgen	(United States) Onyx Pharmaceuticals	Acquisition	10.4	14	

== Failed mergers and acquisitions ==
Rank	Year	Purchaser	Target	Value (in billions USD)	Value (adjusted for inflation)	Note
1	2015	(United States) Pfizer	(Republic of Ireland) Allergan, plc	160	217	In November 2015 Pfizer announced it would acquire Allergan, plc for $160 billion ($217 billion, adjusted for inflation). However, this deal was cancelled in April 2016 due to new US tax inversion rules. Had this transaction been completed, this would have been the largest within this industry.
2	2014	(United States) Pfizer	(United Kingdom) (Sweden) Astra Zeneca	123	167	Significant concerns were raised by the UK Government over job security, in the end leading to a deal being abandoned due to resistance from the AstraZeneca Board.
3	2014	(United States) Pfizer	(United Kingdom) (Sweden) Astra Zeneca	106	145	AstraZeneca claimed the deal undervalued the company.
4	2014	(United States) Pfizer	(United Kingdom) (Sweden) Astra Zeneca	99	135	AstraZeneca claimed the deal undervalued the company.
5	1999	(United States) Pfizer	(United States) Warner–Lambert	82.4	159	Pfizer made a hostile bid, just after the announcement of a $72 billion deal with Wyeth, the eventual purchase price would be in excess of $90 billion.
6	1999	(United States) Wyeth	(United States) Warner–Lambert	72	139	Wyeth confirmed it has agreed a $200 billion deal with Warner–Lambert, causing Pfizer to make a hostile bid, just after the announcement.
7	1999	(United States) Wyeth	(United States) Warner–Lambert	65	126	The two companies discussed a potential merger, uniting two of the largest pharmaceutical companies. This was eventually thwarted by Pfizer, in order to maintain control of the blockbuster drug - Lipitor.
8	2016	(Germany) Bayer AG	(United States) Monsanto Company Inc.	65	87	Bayer advanced talks with Monsanto's management and subsequently raised its off by $3 billion, to more than $65 billion - which represented a 2 percent increase on its previous offer. The eventual purchase price would be more than $66 billion.
9	2018	(Japan) Takeda Pharmaceutical	(Republic of Ireland) Shire	62.5	80	Third bid, unanimously rejected by the Shire Board, who concluded that it significantly undervalue the company, its growth prospects as well as pipeline.
10	2016	(Germany) Bayer AG	(United States) Monsanto Company Inc.	62	83	Bayer initially opened negotiations with an offer of $125 per Monsanto share, however management felt this undervalued the company.
11	2018	(Japan) Takeda Pharmaceutical	(Republic of Ireland) Shire	61	78	Second bid, unanimously rejected by the Shire Board, who concluded that it significantly undervalue the company, its growth prospects as well as pipeline.
12	2018	(Japan) Takeda Pharmaceutical	(Republic of Ireland) Shire	58.2	75	First bid, unanimously rejected by the Shire Board, who concluded that it significantly undervalue the company, its growth prospects as well as pipeline.
13	2014	(Canada) Valeant Pharmaceuticals	(Republic of Ireland) Allergan, Inc	54	73	Valeant had pursued Botox-maker Allergan for six months. After a protracted court battle with Valeant, Bill Ackman and his Pershing Square Capital Management hedgefund on one side (which then owned 10% of Allergan) and Allergan on the other, Actavis entered the fray with a $66 billion white knight bid.
14	2014	(United States) AbbVie	(Republic of Ireland) Shire Pharmaceuticals	54	73	The two companies had agreed to a $54 billion deal that would allow AbbVie to move its headquarters overseas to Europe, reducing their corporate tax rate. However, the U.S. Treasury passed laws, tightening down on tax inversion deals just before the merger was completed, making the agreement much less profitable for AbbVie.
15	2014	(Canada) Valeant Pharmaceuticals	(Republic of Ireland) Allergan, Inc	53.3	72	Valeant raised its unsolicited offer for Allergan a second time, to $53.3 billion, increasing the cash portion of the bid in an effort to win the backing of the company, with the cash-and-stock portion of the bid valuing each Allergan share at $179.25.
16	2014	(Canada) Valeant Pharmaceuticals	(Republic of Ireland) Allergan, Inc	49.4	67	Valeant raised its unsolicited offer for Allergan Inc. to $49.4 billion, adding more cash to the bid in an effort to win backing from Allergan and its investors, with the value of each share rising to $166.16 per Allergan share.
17	2015	(United States) Monsanto Company Inc.	(Switzerland) Syngenta AG	47	63	Monsanto dropped its hostile bid for Syngenta, refocusing on its five-year plan to double earnings and avoid a backlash from large shareholders. Subsequently, Bayer offered to purchase Monsanto, with ChemChina offering to acquire Syngenta.
18	2014	(United States) Monsanto Company Inc.	(Switzerland) Syngenta AG	45	61	Syngenta rejecteded another unsolicited offer from Monsanto, worth $45 billion, with management saying it undervalued the company and a merger would carry significant risks. Monsanto offered to acquire the company at a price of 449 Swiss francs per Syngenta share, with approximately 45% of the price paid in cash.
19	2014	(Canada) Valeant Pharmaceuticals	(Republic of Ireland) Allergan, Inc	45	61	Valeant Pharmaceuticals and activist investor Bill Ackman offered to buy Botox maker Allergan, proposing a cash-and-stock deal worth about $152.89.
20	2014	(United States) Monsanto Company Inc.	(Switzerland) Syngenta AG	40	54	Monsanto weighed $40 billion unsolicited bid for Swiss rival, Syngenta aiming to avoid US corporation taxes. Monsanto and Syngenta held preliminary talks with both sets of advisers in the preceding few months, with talks centered on a combination. However, Syngenta's management decided against negotiations.
21	2015	(Israel) Teva Pharmaceutical Industries	(Netherlands) Mylan	40	54	In April, Teva offered to acquire Mylan for $40 billion, only a fortnight after Mylan offered to acquire Perrigo for $29 billion. Teva's offer for Mylan is contingent on Mylan abandoning its acquisition of Perrigo. Mylan stated in June 2015 that Teva's disclosure that it had a 1.35 percent stake in Mylan violated US anti-trust rules.
22	2015	(Netherlands) Mylan	(Republic of Ireland) Perrigo	26	35	In order for the hostile takeover to go through successfully, Mylan needed 50% of Perrigos shares to be tendered under the deal. However, only 40% or 58 million shares were tendered and the hostile takeover fell through.
23	2004	(United States) Johnson & Johnson	(United States) Guidant	25.4	43	Johnson & Johnson announced that it was acquiring Guidant on December 15, 2004, for $76 a share, with the deal being approved later approved on April 27, 2005, by Guidant shareholders. However, on May 25 of the same year, Guidant reported 26 cases of implantable defibrillator failure, including a death. Johnson & Johnson announced the possibility of them pulling out from the deal, Guidant then sued Johnson & Johnson in an attempt to enforce the acquisition. However they later re-negotiated a lower price of $21.5 billion.
24	2006	(United States) Boston Scientific	(United States) Guidant	25.0	40	A day after Johnson & Johnson raised their price for Guidant to $23.2 billion, Boston Scientific announced a further increased offer.
25	2005	(United States) Boston Scientific	(United States) Guidant	24.6	41	With the lower re-negotiated a lower price of $21.5 billion between Johnson & Johnson and Guidant, Boston Scientific announced an unsolicited offer of $24.6 billion for Guidant (an offer of $72 per share of Guidant, $36 in cash and a fixed number of Boston Scientific shares valued at $36 a share).
26	2006	(United States) Johnson & Johnson	(United States) Guidant	24.2	39	After Boston Scientific increased their offer to $25 billion, Johnson & Johnson further increased their offer to $24.2 billion.
27	2006	(United States) Johnson & Johnson	(United States) Guidant	23.2	37	After the re-negotiated a lower price of $21.5 billion was trumped by Boston Scientifics offer of $24.6 billion, Johnson & Johnson raised their offer to $23.2 billion.
28	2015	(Republic of Ireland) Endo International	(United States) Salix Pharmaceuticals	11.2	15	Endo withdrew its $11.2 billion cash & stock offer for Salix, ending its plans to outbid Valeant Pharmaceuticals International for the company.

== See also ==
- List of largest mergers and acquisitions
