= Jerini =

German pharmaceutical company

Jerini AG
- Founded: Berlin, Germany (1994)
- Headquarters: Berlin, Germany
- Key people: Jens Schneider-Mergener, CEO; Adi Hoess, Chief Commercial Officer; Jochen Knolle, Chief Scientific Officer, Head of R & D; Berndt Modig, Chief Financial Officer
- Products: icatibant
- Number of employees: 139 (2006)
- Website: www.jerini.com

Jerini AG was a pharmaceutical company based in Berlin, Germany, which focused on the discovery and development of novel peptide-based drugs. Using a proprietary technology platform, Peptides-to-Drugs (P2D), Jerini pursued disease indications for which limited, inadequate, or no treatment options exist. As a result, Jerini established a drug pipeline composed of its own programs as well as others in collaboration with partners. Jerini's commercialization strategy was to market new drugs in niche indications independently and in larger indications with partners. Jerini was acquired by Shire plc in 2008.

Jerini started operations in 1994. Jerini's subsidiaries Jerini US Inc. and JPT Peptide Technologies GmbH, provider of peptides and peptide microarrays, were acquired by Theracode GmbH, Mainz in 2009. Jerini was financed with venture capital provided by TVM and HealthCap. It went public on the Prime Standard of the Frankfurt Stock Exchange (JI4), and had raised a total of over 130 million Euro in public and private financing to date.

== Firazyr (icatibant) ==
Jerini's lead compound Firazyr (icatibant), is an inhibitor of the action of the hormone bradykinin on its B2 receptor. This compound was in-licensed from Aventis in 2001. It has been approved for hereditary angioedema in all member states of the European Union in July 2008. The drug was granted FDA approval on August 25, 2011.

== Peptides-to-Drugs (P2D) platform ==
Based on its P2D platform, Jerini established several in-house development programs, to address indications within the ophthalmology, oncology, and inflammatory therapeutic areas. The most advanced of these programs targeted age-related macular degeneration (AMD), the leading cause of vision loss and blindness in people over the age of 55 in developed countries. Jerini's compound (JSM 6427) has shown significant efficacy in combating disease progression in preclinical models.

Jerini's proprietary Peptides-to-Drugs (P2D) technology was used to identify peptide drug lead structures and systematically transform them into peptidomimetic (injectable) and small-molecule (oral) drugs, depending on the indication. This enabled Jerini to develop novel drug candidates for diseases that were difficult to access using traditional drug discovery methods. The ability to produce both peptidomimetics and small molecule drugs as drug candidates has enabled the simultaneous development of drugs for acute and chronic treatments against the same target molecule (target).
