= Attempted merger of Publicis and Omnicom =

- Initiated: July 28, 2013
- Cancelled: May 9, 2014

The attempted merger of Publicis and Omnicom was a proposed advertising industry merger between Publicis and Omnicom, announced on July 28, 2013. The resulting company would have been called Publicis Omnicom Group, and would have been the world's biggest advertising group with market capitalisation of $35.1 billion, pro-forma revenue of $22.7 billion, and more than 130,000 employees across the world. After the merger, Publicis Omnicom and WPP would have been the largest advertising groups in the world., followed at a distance by Dentsu and Interpublic Group of Companies. The Publicis and Omnicom chief executives heralded the proposed operation as a "merger of equals" saying that Publicis and Omnicom shareholders will each hold about 50 percent of the new group's equity. The group would have had head offices in Paris and New York.

The deal was called off in mutual agreement by both sides on 9 May 2014 after a relationship breakdown in proposal. Contemporary industry analysis identified three structural failures in the merger negotiations: the 50-50 co-CEO governance framework, unresolved tax-domicile questions between the U.S. Treasury and the French finance ministry, and client-conflict exposure across major consumer categories including Coca-Cola/PepsiCo and Procter & Gamble/Unilever.

== Merger ==
=== Rationale ===
The unexpected merger was proposed by Maurice Lévy, CEO of Publicis. The mega-merger would put together Publicis with Omnicom, respectively with $8.8 and $14.2 billion in revenues in 2012, and a market capitalisation of $14.6 billion and $16.7 billion at the announcement. This compares with WPP, who recorded $15.6 billion in 2012 revenues and had market capitalisation of around $20 billion. On a pro-forma basis, the merged entity would become the biggest advertising group on the market, and would have around $5 billion more revenue than the current market leader. The merger would have consolidated the sector, as it would pull the two largest, Publicis Omnicom and WPP, significantly ahead of the next largest – Interpublic Group, Dentsu and Havas. In a reference to the increasingly powerful new media giants Google and Facebook, Lévy noted the merger was a response to the sea-change in the communication and marketing landscape and the blurring the roles of all players, to the benefit of clients. Publicis stated that $500 million in synergies would be generated.

Although Omnicom generated more top-line revenues than Publicis, its profit margin was only 15% compared to 18% achieved by Publicis. Thus Lévy was able to leverage this and obtain half of the new company for Publicis shareholders in an "equal" merger". Sir Martin Sorrell, head of WPP, praised the "extremely bold and brave and surprising move", but expressed reservations about the different cultures to be merged.

=== Organization ===
The proposed company would be listed on both the Euronext Paris and New York Stock Exchange, corresponding to the previous headquarters of Publicis and Omnicom respectively, and the OMC ticker on the NYSE retained. However, Lévy stated that for reasons of neutrality (and not tax), the new holding was to be registered in the Netherlands. The merger, which received unanimous approval of both boards, would close in late 2013 or early 2014. The 71-year-old Maurice Lévy would jointly head the group with Ominicom's John Wren during the initial integration and development period lasting 30 months, after which Levy would become non-executive chairman and Wren sole CEO. The board would have equal representation from Publicis and Omnicom, its 16 directors include both Lévy and Wren.

=== Ownership ===
The Publicis and Omnicom chief executives heralded the proposed operation as a "merger of equals" saying that Publicis and Omnicom shareholders would collectively each hold about 50 percent of the new group's equity. Trade press reported the unwillingness of Élisabeth Badinter, daughter of Publicis' founder Marcel Bleustein-Blanchet and chairman of the supervisory board of Publicis, to exit – she apparently refused to be bought out by a banking syndicate. However, as the largest shareholder of Publicis, she was expected to have her 9.13 percent holding of the company diluted by half as a result of the merger. (Note: Badinter is the largest shareholder of Publicis, with 9.13% of the equity and 16.57% of voting rights.) Omnicom CEO John Wren was reported as holding 1.1 million Omnicom shares, and a considerable number of stock options that a change of control would crystallise.

=== Concerns ===
The deal was subject to regulatory approval, although the French government had indicated its support, according to Lévy. As the deal would bring together worldwide networks like BBDO, TBWA and DDB from Omnicom as well as Leo Burnett, Publicis, and Saatchi & Saatchi under a single holding company, there was potential for client conflict. AdWeek noted that PepsiCo is handled by Omnicom's TBWA\Chiat\Day and the Coca-Cola account resides at Publicis' Leo Burnett. Similarly, AT&T was with Omnicom and Verizon with Publicis.

Some commentators expressed concern, with Craig Le Grice of The Drum saying that it would be "creating a sector essentially owned by two holding companies", but not all industry observers were equally worried. Wren believed that the merger would "create value and new opportunities".

== Cancellation of merger ==
The expected completion of the merger in late 2013 failed to materialise, and created great uncertainty for the industry players. In May 2014, it was announced that the merger would no longer go ahead due to the magnitude of challenges yet remaining. The announcement was made in a statement released jointly from the two chief executives of Publicis and Omnicom. Reuters reported that the two holding companies' agencies had been losing billions in business pitches due to the uncertainty, and that business worth $1.5 billion had been lost just in the last month prior to the decision to cancel, and that WPP agencies had aggressively cut fees to gain new business from their rivals, but this was denied by Omnicom

From the start, huge difficulties were foreseen for a merger of this magnitude, most importantly different corporate cultures and management philosophies. There were known to have been significant tax issues. While Wren was keen to emphasise in explaining the collapse that "there was no one factor" at play responsible, Lévy indicated the deal-breaker was Omnicom's insistence on keeping all three top posts for its own executives. Lévy said: "it is not a merger of equals if you have a CEO, CFO and general counsel only from one side". While Omnicom has a more devolved organisation and lower margins than its counterpart, it is known that Publicis enjoys higher net margins and does so through greater centralisations; the CFO position would have been a key determinant in the merged organisation.
