= Shire (pharmaceutical company) =

British pharmaceutical company

Shire plc
- Type: Subsidiary
- Traded as: Nasdaq: SHPG
- ISIN: JE00B2QKY057
- Industry: Pharmaceuticals
- Predecessor: Shire Pharmaceuticals Group Plc
- Founded: 1986
- Defunct: 2019; 7 years ago
- Fate: Acquired by Takeda
- Headquarters: Massachusetts, United States
- Key people: Flemming Ørnskov (CEO); Thomas Dittrich (CFO)
- Revenue: $15,160.6 million (2017)
- Operating income: $2,455.2 million (2017)
- Net income: $4,271.5 million (2017)
- Number of employees: 23,044 (2018)
- Parent: Takeda Pharmaceutical Company (2019)
- Website: www.shire.com

Shire plc was a UK-founded Jersey-registered specialty biopharmaceutical company. Originating in the United Kingdom with an operational base in the United States, its brands and products included Vyvanse, Lialda, and Adderall XR. Shire was acquired by Takeda Pharmaceutical Company on 8 January 2019.

Shire was a global biotechnology company focused on serving people with rare diseases and other highly specialized conditions. The company's products were available in 100+ countries across core therapeutic areas including Hematology, Immunology, Neuroscience, Lysosomal Storage Disorders, Gastrointestinal / Internal Medicine / Endocrine and Hereditary Angioedema; a growing franchise in Oncology; and an emerging pipeline in Ophthalmics.

The original corporate headquarters was located in Basingstoke, Hampshire, England. Main offices were located in Dublin, Ireland, the United States in Cambridge, Massachusetts, and Chicago, Illinois, and in Zug, Switzerland. In addition, Shire owned manufacturing sites in Lexington, Massachusetts, and Social Circle, Georgia. Shire's headquarters in Lexington, Massachusetts, were integrated with Takeda's new U.S. headquarters, which were relocated from Deerfield, Illinois, to the Boston area.

== History ==
=== Early history ===
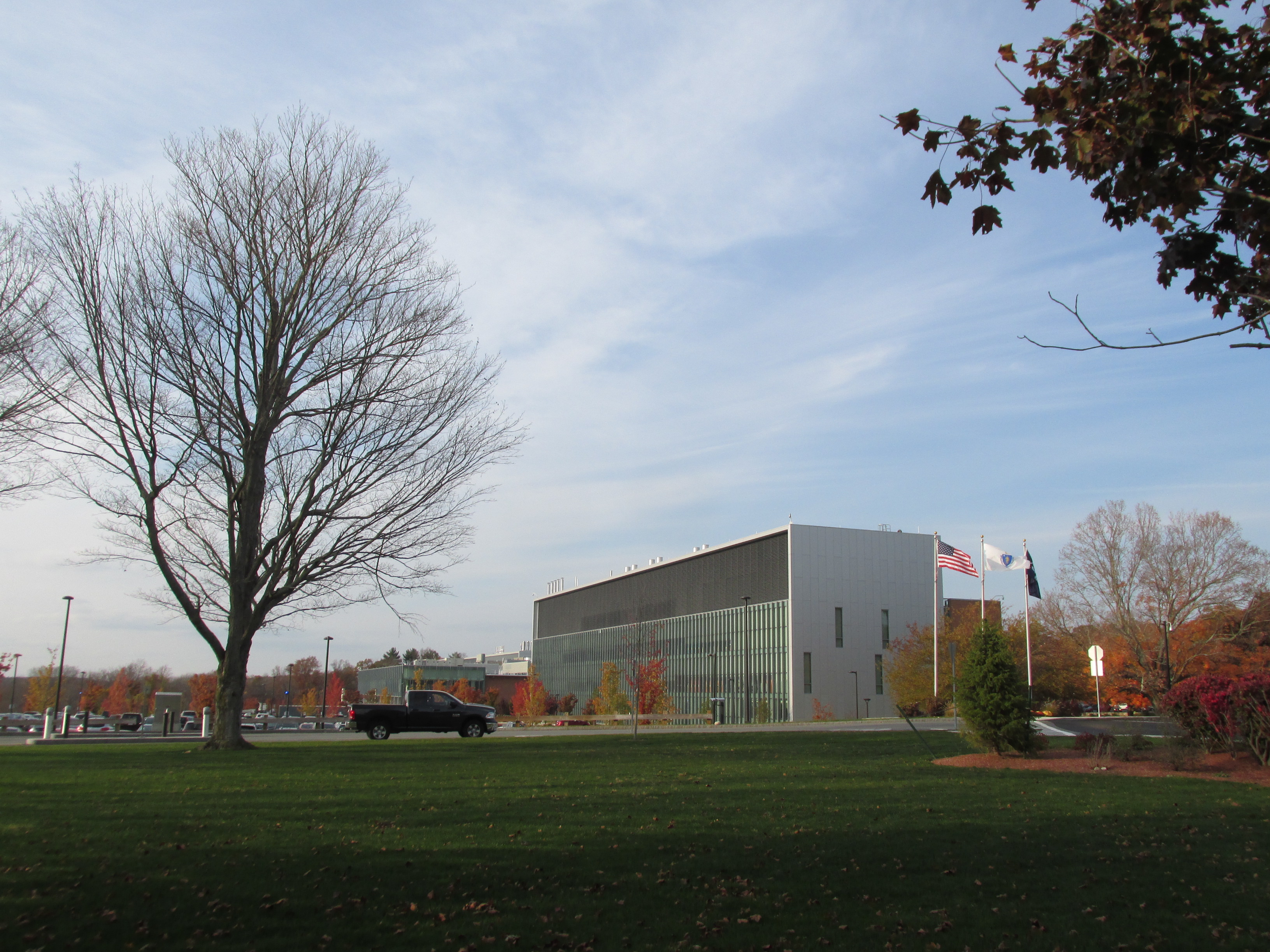
Location in Lexington, Massachusetts, US

Shire was founded in 1986 in the UK by five entrepreneurs: Harry Stratford, Dennis Stephens, Peter Moriarty, Geoff Hall and Dr Jim Murray. Under the management of Rolf Stahel, Shire was first listed on the London Stock Exchange in 1996. Shire's initial products were calcium supplements (Calcichew-D_{3}) for patients seeking to treat or prevent osteoporosis. In 1997 the company acquired Pharmavene for £105 million in order to access Pharmavene's drug delivery methods. Later in the same year Shire acquired Richwood Pharmaceutical Company, forming Shire-Richwood Inc.

=== 2000 to 2009 ===
In 2001 the company acquired Biochem Canada. Shire's next acquisition didn't come until 2005 when it acquired Transkaryotic Therapeutics and two years later – in 2007 – New River Pharmaceuticals Inc, for a then company record of $2.6 billion. With the purchase of New River, Shire gained access and ownership of Vyvanse. A year later the company acquired the German company Jerini, for $521 million. Jerini focused on treating hereditary angioedema.

In 2008, in reaction to new taxation measures announced by the UK government in the treatment of royalties on patents, the company moved its tax domicile to Dublin, Ireland.

=== 2010 onwards ===
2010 saw a change in company strategy, with the company seeking to expand through mergers and acquisitions - culminating in the company becoming one of the most acquisitive in the industry. In 2010 the company acquired Movetis, a Belgian company focusing on gastrointestinal products for $565 million, a year later it acquired regenerative medicine manufacturer Advanced BioHealing. In 2012 the company acquired FerroKin BioSciences for $325 million along with FerroKins lead iron chelator - FBS0701. 2013 saw the company complete its highest number of acquisitions with Lotus Tissue Repair, Inc. (lead compound, ABH001), SARcode Bioscience Inc., with the last being ViroPharma. Shire changed the name of ViroPharma to Shire Viropharma Inc. upon acquisition and on their final day of trading the company was valued at $3.3 billion. At $4.2 billion, ViroPharma set a new company record. In 2014 Shire acquired two rare disease drug companies: Fibrotech with its antifibrotic compounds for $75 million, and Lumena, a company researching rare gastro-intestinal and hepatic compounds, for $260 million.

In 2015, NPS Pharmaceuticals was acquired for $5.2 billion, bringing along its rare disease drugs Gattex and Natpara. On their final day of trading, NPS had a market capitalisation of $4.99 billion. The company also acquired, later in the same year, Meritage Pharma for $245 million, Foresight Biotherapeutics for $300 million and Dyax for $6.5 billion. The purchases bolstered Shires gastro-intestinal and rare disease sectors, with Phase-III-ready treatment - Budesonide - for the treatment of eosinophilic esophagitis. As well as expanding the company's pipeline with a late-stage treatment candidate for infectious conjunctivitis with lead candidate FST-100 and increasing the company's rare disease catalogue with Dyax's portfolio of plasma kallikrein inhibitors against hereditary angioedema (led by the approved drug Kalbitor and the Phase III DX-2930). In January 2016, the company made its most significant purchase, with the $32 billion acquisition of Baxalta (which had been spun-off from Baxter the previous year), creating the largest global biotech company focused solely on rare diseases.

In April 2018, Shire agreed to sell its oncology business to French pharmaceutical company Servier for £1.7billion.

==== Aborted AbbVie takeover ====
On 20 June 2014, Shire rejected a takeover attempt by AbbVie. AbbVie offered £46.11 per share (£27.3 billion or $46.5 billion in total). On 8 July, the offer was increased to $51.5 billion. On 18 July, it was announced that AbbVie would acquire Shire for $54.8 billion. On 15 October, news broke suggesting AbbVie was reconsidering their proposed takeover deal due to changes in US "Tax Inversion" law and on 16 October AbbVie's board recommended that shareholders vote against the deal. This news sent Shire's share price down over 27%; however, AbbVie would be subject to a $1.6 billion break-up fee, payable to Shire. On 21 October, the merger was called off.

==== Takeda takeover ====
In April 2018, reported that Takeda Pharmaceutical Company had an approach to acquire Shire. Days later Shire announced they had rejected all three Takeda bids. The first bid valued the business at £41 billion (£28 per Shire shares paid in Takeda shares plus £16 per share in cash), the second £43 billion (£28.75 per Shire shares paid in Takeda shares plus £16.75 per share in cash) and the third £44 billion (£28 per Shire shares paid in Takeda shares plus £17.75 per share in cash). Reuters also reported interest from Allergan however they ruled themselves out a day later. A day later Takeda increased their offer with a fourth bid, to £26 per Shire shares paid in Takeda shares plus £21 per share in cash - giving a total value of £44.3 billion ($62.1 billion). On 24 April, Takeda submitted an enhanced fifth bid for the company. On 25 April, Shire said that they will recommend the revised £45.8 billion ($64 billion) offer to their shareholders. The enhanced offer included a more generous cash component, with the deal offering £21.76 ($30.33) in cash for each Shire ordinary share. The same day, GlaxoSmithKline ruled out making any form of counter-bid. On 8 May 2018, an agreement was finally reached in which Shire was sold to Takeda in a $62 billion deal. Takeda's acquisition of Shire closed on 8 January 2019.

== Acquisition history ==
Shire Plc Acquisitions
- Shire Plc (Founded 1986, Acq 2019)
  - Pharmavene (Acq 1997)
  - Richwood Pharmaceutical Company (Acq 1997)
  - Biochem Canada (Acq 2001)
  - Transkaryotic Therapeutics (Acq 2005)
  - New River Pharmaceuticals Inc (Acq 2007)
  - Jerini (Acq 2008)
  - Movetis (Acq 2012)
  - Advanced BioHealing (Acq 2011)
  - FerroKin BioSciences (Acq 2012)
  - Lotus Tissue Repair, Inc (Acq 2013)
  - Premacure AB (Acq 2013)
  - SARcode Bioscience Inc (Acq 2013)
  - ViroPharma (Founded 1994, Acq 2013)
    - Lev Pharmaceuticals (Acq 2008)
  - Fibrotech (Acq 2014)
  - Lumena (Acq 2014)
  - NPS Pharmaceuticals (Acq 2015)
  - Meritage Pharma (Acq 2015)
  - Foresight Biotherapeutics (Acq 2015)
  - Dyax (Acq 2015)
  - Baxalta (Acq 2016)

== Products ==
The Annual Revenue figures in the following table were drawn from the company's 2015 preliminary results.

A container of Adderall XR

Name	Annual revenue	Indication
Vyvanse	$1,722M	Attention deficit hyperactivity disorder (ADHD)
Lialda/Mezavant	$684M	Gastrointestinal (ulcerative colitis)
Cinryze	$618M	Swelling attacks in children
Gattex/Revestive & Natpara	$166M	Short Bowel Syndrome (SBS) & hypocalcemia in patients with hypoparathyroidism
Firazyr	$445M	Hereditary angioedema
Replagal	$441M	Fabry Disease (α-galactosidase A deficiency)
Adderall XR	$362M	Attention deficit hyperactivity disorder (ADHD)
Vpriv	$342M	Type 1 Gaucher disease

=== Licences & Royalties ===
In July 2014, Shire licensed the rights to the investigational Hunter syndrome compound, AGT-182, from ArmaGen for up to $225 million.

The Annual Revenue figures in the following Table were drawn from the company's 2015 preliminary results.

Name	Annual revenue	Indication	Licensee
Adderall XR	$70.3M	Attention deficit hyperactivity disorder (ADHD)	Impax and Teva
3TC (Lamivudine) and Zeffix (Lamivudine)	$91.6M	HIV and Chronic hepatitis B	GlaxoSmithKline
Fosrenol	$53.3M	Renal disease	Bayer Yakuhin
Other	$26.4M		

== Corporate leadership ==
Flemming Ørnskov, was the company's chief executive officer through 8 January 2019 with Takeda's acquisition of Shire. Ginger Gregory as chief human resources officer, Jeffrey Poulton as CFO, and Philip Vickers as head of R&D. James Bowling vacated his position as interim CFO in the aftermath of the collapse of the AbbVie inversion deal. The chair of Shire's board of directors was Susan Kilsby.

== Legal issues ==
=== False Claims Act violations ===
In September 2014, Shire reached a $56.5 million settlement with the U.S. Department of Justice for alleged violations of the False Claims Act. The Justice Department alleged that Shire had improperly marketed and promoted Adderall XR, Daytrana, Vyvanse, Pentasa, and Lialda during various periods between 2004 and 2010. The allegations included claims that Shire had made exaggerated and false statements regarding product safety, promoted medications for non-FDA approved off-label use, and marketed products on unsubstantiated claims of beneficial side effects, including reductions in criminality, traffic accidents, sexually transmitted infections, and divorce rates.

=== Illegal promotion of Dermagraft ===
In August 2017, Shire reached a $350 million settlement with the Department of Justice for violations of the same act, regarding the unlawful promotion of Shire's product Dermagraft.

== See also ==
- Pharmaceutical industry in the United Kingdom
- Takeda Pharmaceuticals
