= Actavis =

Global pharmaceutical company

Actavis Generics
- Type: Subsidiary
- Traded as: NYSE: ACT
- Industry: Branded and generic pharmaceuticals, and pharmaceutical research and development
- Founded: March 1984; 42 years ago in Libertyville, Illinois, United States
- Founder: Allen Chao, Ph.D. and David Hsia, Ph.D.
- Defunct: 2015
- Fate: 2015 Irish tax inversion and merger with Allergan, Inc.
- Successor: Allergan, plc
- Headquarters: Dublin, Ireland and Parsippany-Troy Hills, New Jersey, United States
- Number of locations: 40 manufacturing facilities 27 global R&D centers
- Area served: ≈100 countries
- Key people: Brenton L. Saunders (CEO and president); Paul Bisaro (executive chairman)
- Products: Branded and generic pharmaceuticals
- Revenue: US$13.062 billion (2014)
- Operating income: ▲US$1.090 billion (2014)
- Net income: ▼US$−1.63 billion (2014)
- Total assets: ▲US$6.881 billion (2014)
- Total equity: ▲US$28.335 billion (2014)
- Number of employees: 21,600 (2015)
- Parent: Teva Pharmaceuticals
- Website: www.actavis.com

Actavis Generics (formerly known as Watson Pharmaceuticals and Actavis plc, prior to the acquisition of Irish-based Allergan, Inc.) is a global pharmaceutical company focused on acquiring, developing, manufacturing, and marketing branded pharmaceuticals, generic and over-the-counter medicines, and biologic products. Actavis operates in approximately 100 countries and has global headquarters in Dublin, Ireland and administrative headquarters in Parsippany-Troy Hills, New Jersey.

Actavis markets brand products through six franchises in key therapeutic categories including: Aesthetics/Dermatology/Plastic Surgery; Neurosciences/CNS; Eye Care; Women's Health and Urology; GI and Cystic Fibrosis; and Cardiovascular Disease and Infectious Disease. The company's products include Botox, Namenda, Restasis, Linzess, Bystolic, Juvederm, Latisse, Lo Loestrin Fe, Estrace, Teflaro, Dalvance, Ozurdex, Optive, Natrelle, Viibryd, Liletta, Saphris, Enablex, Actonel, Androderm, Gelnique and others.

Actavis also operates the world's third-largest generics business. The company has been ranked in the top 3 in 12 global markets, the top 5 in 16 global markets, and in the top 10 in 33 global markets. Actavis also develops and out-licenses generic pharmaceutical products outside the US through its Medis third-party business, the world's largest generic pharmaceutical out-licensing business. Medis has more than 300 customers globally, and offers more than 200 products. Actavis PLC is also developing biosimilars products in oncology and other therapeutic categories, and currently has five biosimilar products in development. Actavis PLC has more than 40 manufacturing and distribution facilities around the world, with a capacity of approximately 40 billion units annually. Actavis Global Operations also included Anda Inc, the fourth-largest US generic pharmaceutical product distributor in the United States.

On June 15, 2015, Actavis plc changed its name to Allergan plc, but the company's U.S. and Canadian generics business will continue to operate under the Actavis name. In July 2015, Allergan PLC announced it would sell its Generics division of the company, including Anda Inc, to Teva Pharmaceuticals for $40.5 billion, a transaction proposed for completion by the first quarter of 2016.

== History ==
=== Early years ===
The company was founded in the spring of 1983, when, with funding from friends and family, colleagues Allen Chao, Ph.D. and David Hsia, Ph.D., began a small drug development enterprise. Just two months later, the founders established an initial product-development and analytical laboratory with six employees (including both founders) in a leased space in Libertyville, Illinois (U.S.).

By late fall of the same year, the company moved to Southern California into an initial 2,000-square-foot (190 m^{2}) leased facility in Corona, and the development and manufacturing of generic pharmaceuticals began. The Corona site became the corporate headquarters for the rapidly expanding US company.

Throughout its history, Actavis has expanded both organically and as the result of strategic acquisitions. In 1993, Actavis, then Watson, announced its initial public offering (IPO) of shares of common stock. The company was initially listed on the NASDAQ under the ticker symbol WATS. The company moved to the New York Stock Exchange (NYSE) in 1997, and began trading under the symbol WPI.

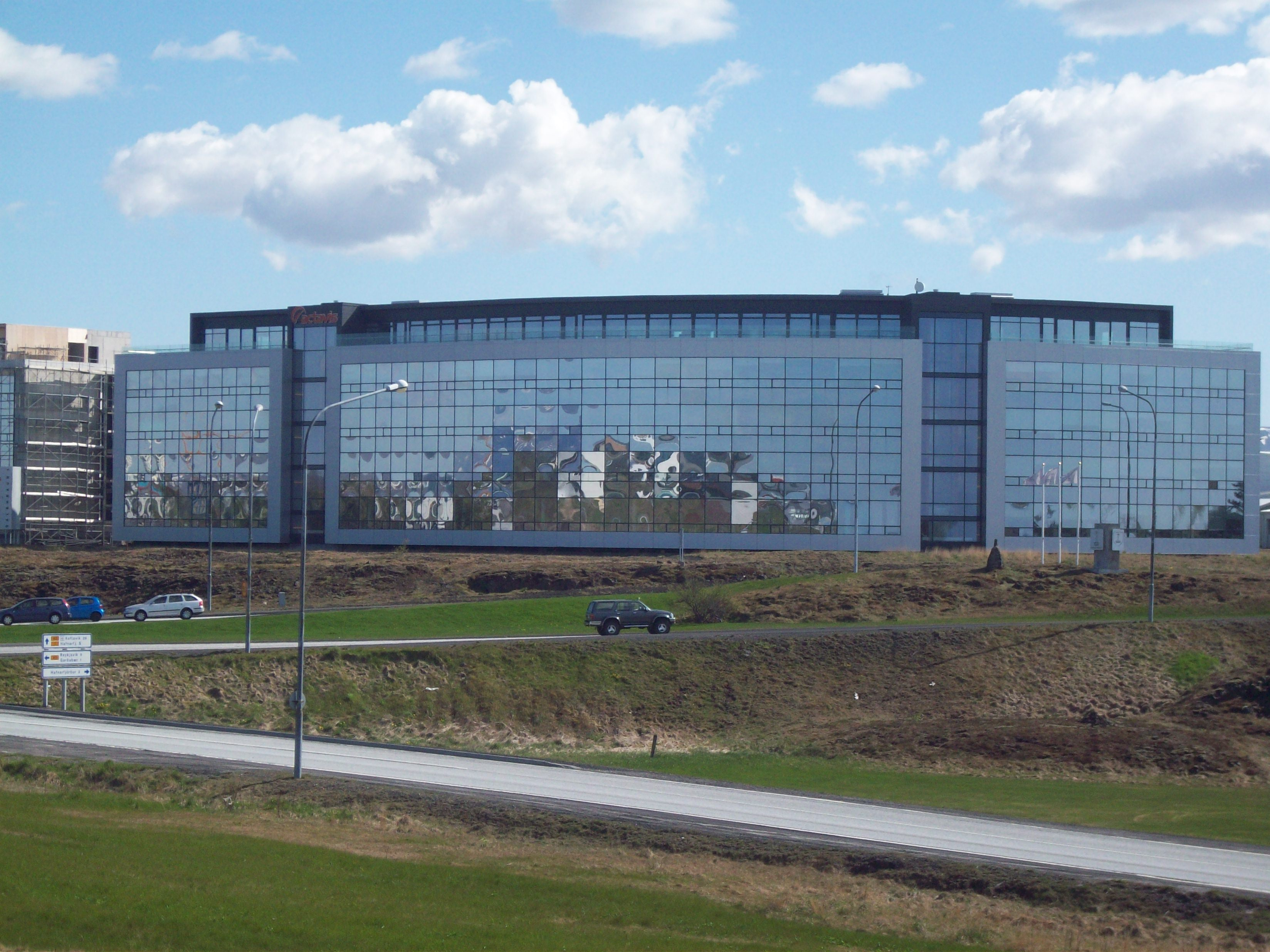
Actavis facility in Iceland

=== 2000 to 2009 ===
In 2000, the company acquired Schein Pharmaceutical Inc, an acquisition that more than doubled the company's size. In that same year, the group reported revenues in excess of $1 billion. In the fall of 2006, it acquired Andrx Corporation, a Fort Lauderdale, Florida–based pharmaceutical company founded by Alan Cohen, making it the third largest specialty pharmaceutical company based on total prescriptions dispensed. In 2007, Dr. Allen Chao retired as President and Chief Executive Officer (CEO) and was succeeded by Paul M. Bisaro. The company's international presence began with the acquisition of the Arrow Group in 2009, providing the company with commercial presence in more than 20 international markets. As a result of the Arrow acquisition, the company also acquired the biopharmaceutical development organization Eden Biodesign in Liverpool, UK.

=== 2011 to 2014 ===
In 2011, Watson moved its corporate headquarters from Corona, California to Parsippany, New Jersey. The new LEED-certified corporate headquarters at the Morris Corporate Center in Parsippany was formally dedicated on June 9, 2011.

==== Actavis acquisition and Watson name change ====
In November 2012, Watson acquired the Switzerland-based, global generics company Actavis Group for €4.25 billion, creating the world's third largest generics company, with a leading position in key established commercial markets including the US, the UK, Nordics, Canada, Australia, and emerging markets in Central and Eastern Europe, and Russia. Following the acquisition, Watson adopted Actavis' name for its global operations.

==== Warner Chilcott PLC acquisition ====
On October 1, 2013, Actavis acquired Irish pharmaceutical company Warner Chilcott PLC (previously known as Galen) in a stock-for-stock transaction valued at approximately $8.5 billion. The combination created a company with approximately $10 billion in anticipated combined annual 2013 revenue, and the third-largest US specialty pharmaceutical company with approximately $3 billion in annual revenue focused on the core therapeutic categories of women's health, urology, gastroenterology and dermatology. In association with the merger the company relocated its corporate headquarters to Ireland while maintaining its operational headquarters in Parsippany, taking advantage of the lower (17% vs. 35% in the United States) Irish corporate tax rate. This deal inspired a series of similar moves by other drug companies and led to new Treasury Department regulations limiting the ability of companies to perform such inversions, although Actavis was exempt from these regulations as its move abroad had already been completed. CEO Paul Bisaro stated that in making the inversion, they were trying to "level the playing field" given the high corporate tax rate in the United States.

==== Forest Laboratories acquisition ====
On July 1, 2014, Actavis announced that it had completed its acquisition of Forest Laboratories (who previously acquired, Furiex Pharmaceuticals Inc and Aptalis Pharma) in a cash and equity transaction valued at approximately $25 billion. Following the acquisition, the company restructured its executive leadership, with Paul Bisaro being named Executive Chairman, and Brent Saunders being appointed CEO and President of the combined organization.

==== Allergan Inc acquisition and Actavis PLC name change ====
In November 2014, Actavis PLC announced its intention to acquire Allergan Inc, the manufacturer of Botox. Completion of the deal would increase its market capitalization to $147 billion. On March 17, 2015, Actavis PLC completed the acquisition of Allergan Inc in a cash and equity transaction valued at approximately $70.5 billion. The combination created a $23 billion diversified global pharmaceutical company with commercial reach across 100 countries. In June 2015, Actavis PLC officially changed its name to Allergan PLC.

== Lineage ==
- Teva Pharmaceuticals
  - Actavis, PLC
    - Auden Mckenzie Holdings Limited
      (Acq. 2015 by Actavis)
    - - Durata Therapeutics
        (Acq. 2014 by Actavis)
      - - Forest Laboratories
          (Acq. 2014 by Actavis)
        - Furiex Pharmaceuticals Inc
          (Acq. 2014 by Forest)
        - Aptalis Pharma
          (Eurand Pharmaceuticals & Axcan Pharma merged 2011,
          Acq. 2014 by Forest)
        - - Galen
            (Acq. 2013 by Actavis)
          - Warner Chilcott PLC
            (Acq. 2000 by Galen, adopted Warners name)
          - Procter & Gamble's prescription drug unit
            (Acq. 2009 by Warner)
          - - Watson Pharmaceuticals
            - - Andrx Corporation
                (Acq. 2006 by Watson)
              - Arrow Group
                (Acq. 2009 by Watson)
              - Eden Biodesign
                (Acq. by Watson)
              - Specifar Pharmaceuticals S.A.
                (Acq. 2011 by Watson)
              - Ascent Pharmahealth Ltd
                (Acq. 2012 by Watson)
              - Actavis Group
                (Acq. 2012 by Watson, adopted Actavis' name)
  - Allergan Inc
    - Kythera Biopharmaceuticals
      (Acq. 2015)
    - - MAP Pharmaceuticals Inc
        (Acq. 2013)
      - - Inamed Corporation
          (Acq. 2006)
        - - Allergan
            (Advanced Medical Optics spun off in 2006)

== Locations and facilities ==
=== Global headquarters ===
The company's global headquarters are located in Dublin, Ireland, and administrative headquarters are located in Parsippany, New Jersey, US.

=== Manufacturing facilities ===
The company has 40 manufacturing facilities in five continents providing the company with a core leadership position in modified release products, solid oral dosages, transdermals, semi-solids, liquids and injectables. The company's manufacturing facilities are located in Belgium, Brazil, Bulgaria, Canada, China, France, Germany, Greece, Iceland, India, Indonesia, Ireland, Northern-Ireland, Italy, Malta, Puerto Rico, Romania, Singapore, Serbia, Thailand, the UK and the US.

=== Research and development facilities ===
Actavis PLC has 27 global R&D facilities focusing on the development of modified release products, solid oral dosages, transdermals, semi-solids, liquids and injectables around the world. The company's R&D facilities are located in Belgium, Bulgaria, China, France, Iceland, Italy, India, Indonesia, Ireland, Japan, Romania, the UK and the US.

== United Kingdom price fixing charges ==
In December 2016, the company was accused by the Competition and Markets Authority (CMA) of breaking competition law by "abuse of its dominant position" in the UK market and charging excessive and unfair prices". It was alleged that the company had increased the price of hydrocortisone tablets by more than 12,000% over the course of eight years. It sold about 943,000 packets of the tablets to the National Health Service in 2015. 10 mg hydrocortisone tablets,, which were sold for 79p in April 2008, cost £88 per pack by March 2016; 20 mg hydrocortisone tablets in March 2008 were sold for £1.07, but £102.74 in 2016. From 2008 to 2015, NHS expenditure on the drug rose from £522,000 to £70 million. The CMA reported its decision on 31 March 2022, confirming its findings of excessive and unfair prices being charged and anti-competitive agreements preventing the entry of potential competition into the market.

== In popular culture ==
Due to their production of "Promethazine With Codeine Cough Syrup", the main ingredient in the recreational drug nicknamed 'lean', the brand has been name-dropped by multiple well known hip-hop artists and rappers including Migos, Chief Keef and Future. Actavis discontinued production of the syrup in 2014. However, Actavis have not ceased production of cough syrup containing hydrocodone and homatropine.
