= Andrew Solomon =

American writer (born 1963)

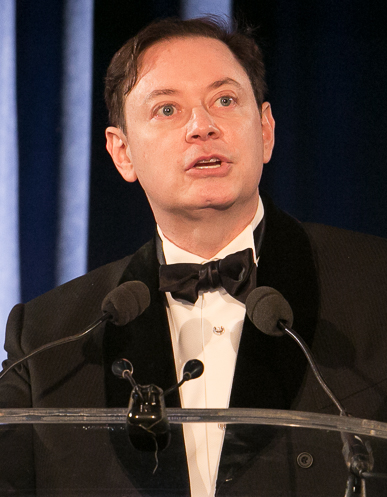
- Solomon in 2015
- Born: October 30, 1963 (age 63); Manhattan, New York, US
- Education: Horace Mann School; Yale University (BA); University of Cambridge (MA, PhD)
- Occupation: Writer
- Website: andrewsolomon.com

Andrew Solomon (born October 30, 1963) is an American writer on politics, culture and psychology. He has written for The New York Times, The New Yorker, Artforum, Travel and Leisure, and other publications on a range of subjects, including depression, Soviet artists, the cultural rebirth of Afghanistan, Libyan politics, and deaf culture.

Solomon's book The Noonday Demon: An Atlas of Depression won the 2001 National Book Award, was a finalist for the 2002 Pulitzer Prize, and was included in The Times list of one hundred best books of the decade. Honors awarded to Far from the Tree: Parents, Children, and the Search for Identity include the 2012 National Book Critics Circle Award, the Media for a Just Society Award of the National Council on Crime and Delinquency, the Anisfield-Wolf Book Award, the Dayton Literary Peace Prize, the J. Anthony Lukas Book Prize, and the Wellcome Book Prize.

Solomon is a professor of clinical psychology at Columbia University Medical Center, adjunct professor of clinical psychology at Weill Cornell Medicine, a lecturer at Yale School of Medicine, and a past president of PEN American Center.

== Early life and education ==
=== Family ===
Solomon's paternal grandfather, who was Jewish, emigrated from Dorohoi, Romania, to the United States in 1900. Solomon is the oldest son of Carolyn Bower Solomon and Howard Solomon, former chairman of Forest Laboratories and founder of Hildred Capital Partners; he is brother to David Solomon, also of Hildred Capital Partners. Solomon described the experience of his family's presence at his mother's planned suicide at the end of a long battle with ovarian cancer in an article for The New Yorker; in a fictionalized account in his novel, A Stone Boat; and again in The Noonday Demon. Solomon's subsequent depression, eventually managed with psychotherapy and antidepressant medications, inspired his father to secure FDA approval to market citalopram (Celexa) in the United States.

=== Education ===
Solomon was born and raised in Manhattan. He attended the Horace Mann School, graduating cum laude in 1981. He received a Bachelor of Arts degree in English from Yale University in 1985, graduating magna cum laude, and later earned a master's degree in English at Jesus College, Cambridge. In August 2013, he was awarded a Ph.D. in psychology from Cambridge, with a thesis on attachment theory prepared under the supervision of Juliet Mitchell.

== Publications and career ==
In 1988, Solomon began his study of Russian artists, which culminated with the publication of The Irony Tower: Soviet Artists in a Time of Glasnost (Knopf, 1991). His first novel, A Stone Boat (Faber, 1994), the story of a man's shifting identity as he watches his mother battle cancer, was a runner up for the Los Angeles Times First Fiction prize.

From 1993 to 2001, Solomon was a contributing writer for The New York Times Magazine.

The Noonday Demon: An Atlas of Depression was originally published in May 2001, and has been translated into twenty-four languages. It was named a Notable Book of 2001 by The New York Times, and was included in the American Library Association's 2002 list of Notable Books. It won the National Book Award for Nonfiction; the Books for a Better Life Award from the National Multiple Sclerosis Society; the 2002 Ken Book Award from the National Alliance on Mental Illness of New York City; Mind Book of the Year; the Lambda Literary Award for Autobiography/Memoir; and Quality Paperback Book Club's New Visions Award.

Following publication of The Noonday Demon, Solomon was honored with the Dr Albert J. Solnit Memorial Award from Fellowship Place; the Voice of Mental Health Award from the Jed Foundation and the National Mental Health Association (now Mental Health America); the Prism Award from the National Depressive and Manic-Depressive Association; the Erasing the Stigma Leadership Award from Didi Hirsch Mental Health Services; the Charles T. Rubey L.O.S.S. Award from the Karla Smith Foundation; and the Silvano Arieti Award from the William Alanson White Institute.

In 2003, Solomon's article, "The Amazing Life of Laura", a profile of diarist Laura Rothenberg, received the Clarion Award for Health Care Journalism, and the Angel of Awareness Award from the Cystic Fibrosis Foundation. In April 2009, his article, "Cancer & Creativity: One Chef's True Story," received the Bert Greene Award for Food Journalism by the International Association of Culinary Professionals; the story was also a finalist for the 11th Annual Henry R. Luce Award. Solomon's reminiscence on a friend who committed suicide won the Folio Eddie Gold Award in 2011.

In addition to his magazine work, Solomon has written essays for many anthologies and books of criticism, and his work has been featured on National Public Radio's Moth Radio Hour.

Far from the Tree: Parents, Children, and the Search for Identity is about how families accommodate children with physical, mental and social disabilities and differences; it was published in November 2012 in the United States and two months later in the UK (under the title, Far from the Tree: A Dozen Kinds of Love). The writing of the book was supported by residencies at Yaddo, MacDowell Colony, Ucross Foundation, and the Rockefeller Foundation Bellagio Center; at MacDowell, Solomon was the DeWitt Wallace/Reader's Digest Fellow and later the Stanford Calderwood fellow. The book was named one of the 10 best books of 2012 and one of the 100 best books of the 21st century by The New York Times. It won the National Book Critics Circle Award in the Nonfiction category, the Media for a Just Society Award of the National Council on Crime and Delinquency, the Anisfield-Wolf Book Award, the Dayton Literary Peace Prize, the National Multiple Sclerosis Society Books for a Better Life Award, the J. Anthony Lukas Book Prize, the Wellcome Book Prize, and the New Atlantic Independent Booksellers Association (NAIBA) Book of the Year Award for Nonfiction. A young adult edition of Far from the Tree was published in July 2017.

Following publication of Far from the Tree, Solomon was also honored with the Yale Department of Psychiatry's Neuroscience 2013 Research Advocacy Award, the Fountain House Humanitarian Award, the Gray Matters Award from the Columbia University Department of Psychiatry, the University of Michigan's Mike Wallace Award, the Friend and Benefactor Award of the Global and Regional Asperger Syndrome Partnership, the National Alliance on Mental Illness Seeds of Hope Award, and the Klerman Award from the Weill-Cornell Medical College Department of Psychiatry.

In Summer of 2014, Solomon was appointed Professor of Clinical Psychology at Columbia University Medical Center. In 2014, Solomon was awarded the Erikson Institute Prize for Excellence in Mental Health Media.

In February 2016, Solomon wrote the introduction to A Mother's Reckoning, a memoir by Sue Klebold, mother of one of the Columbine shooters, Dylan Klebold. He also interviewed Peter Lanza, the father of Adam Lanza, the perpetrator of the Sandy Hook Elementary School shooting.

In April 2016, Scribner published Far and Away: Reporting from the Brink of Change, a collection of Solomon's international reporting since 1991; the book has since been reissued with the title, Far and Away: How Travel Can Change the World. The New York Times included Far and Away in its list of 100 Notable Books of 2016.

On November 10, 2017, Far from the Tree, a documentary based on Solomon's book, premiered at the DOC NYC festival. North American rights to the documentary have been acquired by Sundance Selects.

== Activism and philanthropy ==
Solomon is an activist and philanthropist in LGBTQ rights, mental health, education and the arts. He is founder of the Solomon Research Fellowships in LGBT Studies at Yale University, a member of the board of directors of the Human Rights Campaign and a patron of the Proud2Be Project. His articles on gay marriage have appeared in Newsweek, The Advocate, and Anderson Cooper 360.

Solomon has lectured widely on depression, including at Princeton, Yale, Stanford, Harvard, MIT, Cambridge, and the Library of Congress. He is a Distinguished Associate of the Centre for Family Research at Cambridge University; a director of the University of Michigan Depression Center, Columbia Psychiatry, and Cold Spring Harbor Laboratory; a member of the board of visitors of Columbia Medical School, and the Advisory Boards of the Mental Health Policy Forum at Columbia Mailman School of Public Health and the Depression and Bipolar Support Alliance. In 2011, he was appointed Special Advisor on Lesbian, Gay, Bisexual, and Transgender Mental Health at the Yale School of Psychiatry. In 2008, Solomon received the Society of Biological Psychiatry's Humanitarian Award for his contributions to the field of mental health, and in 2010, the Brain & Behavior Research Foundation's Productive Lives Award.

Solomon's work in the arts and education has included service on the boards of the Alliance for the Arts, the World Monuments Fund, and The Alex Fund, which supports the education of Romani children, He is a member of the PEN American Center Board of Directors, and served as its president from 2015 to 2018. Solomon is a Trustee of the New York Public Library, a Trustee of the Metropolitan Museum, and a member of the Board of Directors of the artists' retreat Yaddo. He is also a fellow of Berkeley College at Yale University, and a member of the New York Institute for the Humanities and the Council on Foreign Relations.

In July 2020, Solomon was one of the 153 signers of the "Harper's Letter" (also known as "A Letter on Justice and Open Debate") that expressed concern that "the free exchange of information and ideas, the lifeblood of a liberal society, is dally becoming more constricted."

== Personal life ==
As an adult, Solomon became a dual citizen of the United States and the United Kingdom. He and journalist John Habich had a civil partnership ceremony on June 30, 2007, at Althorp, the Spencer family estate and childhood home of Diana, Princess of Wales. The couple married again on July 17, 2009, the eighth anniversary of their meeting, in Connecticut, so that their marriage would be legally recognized in the state of New York.

In 2003, Solomon and longtime friend Blaine Smith had a child together; their daughter, Carolyn Blaine Smith Solomon, was born in November 2007. Smith and their child live in Texas. A son, George Charles Habich Solomon, was born in April 2009, and lives in New York with Solomon and Habich, his adoptive father. Habich is also the biological father of two children, Oliver and Lucy Scher, born to lesbian friends who live in Minneapolis. The development of this composite family was the subject of a feature article by Solomon published in Newsweek in January 2011, and in an April 2012 profile in The Observer.

== Bibliography ==
=== Non-fiction ===
- The irony tower : Soviet artists in a time of glasnost. New York: Alfred A. Knopf. 1991.
- The Noonday Demon: An Atlas of Depression. Scribner, New York. 2001.
- Far from the Tree: Parents, Children, and the Search for Identity. Scribner, New York. 2012.
- "The reckoning : the father of the Sandy Hook killer searches for answers". Annals of Psychology. The New Yorker. 90 (4): 36–45. March 17, 2014.
- Far and Away: Reporting from the Brink of Change. Scribner, New York. 2016.
- "The Shape of Love: From Opposite Sides of the Culture, Polyamorists and Polygamists Are Challenging Family Norms". Annals of Domestic Life. The New Yorker. 97 (5): 32–45. March 22, 2021. (Note: Online version is titled "How Polyamorists and Polygamists Are Challenging Family Norms".)
- Flora McDonnell, ed., Threads of Hope: Learning to Live with Depression (Short Books, 2003, ISBN 978-1-904095-35-4), with contributions by Margaret Drabble, Wendy Cope, Andrew Solomon, Virginia Ironside, Lewis Wolpert, Alastair Campbell, and Kay Redfield Jamison.

=== Fiction ===
- A Stone Boat. Faber & Faber, New York. 1994.

=== Reviews and criticism of Solomon's work ===
Far from the Tree

- Heller, Nathan (November 19, 2012). "Little Strangers". The Critics. Books. The New Yorker. Vol. 88, no. 36. pp. 85–90.

———————

== TED and TEDx Talks ==
Solomon is also a TED speaker. The themes of his TED talks include depression, identity, love, acceptance, and the value of travel.

Year	Title	Location
2013	Love, no matter what	TEDMED 2013 Washington, D.C.
2013	Depression, the secret we share	TEDxMet 2013 New York, New York
2014	How the worst moments in our lives make us who we are	TED2014 Vancouver, British Columbia
2017	How open borders make us safe	TEDxExeter 2017 Exeter, Devon
