= Immunocontraception =

Using an animal's anti-disease protections against its reproductive system

Immunocontraception is the use of an animal's immune system to prevent it from fertilizing offspring. Contraceptives of this type are not currently approved for human use.

Typically immunocontraception involves the administration of a vaccine that induces an adaptive immune response which causes an animal to become temporarily infertile. Contraceptive vaccines have been used in numerous settings for the control of wildlife populations. However, experts in the field believe that major innovations are required before immunocontraception can become a practical form of contraception for human beings.

Thus far immunocontraception has focused on mammals exclusively. There are several targets in mammalian sexual reproduction for immune inhibition. They can be organized into three categories.

Gamete production
Organisms that undergo sexual reproduction must first produce gametes, cells which have half the typical number of chromosomes of the species. Current approaches to immunity that prevents gamete production also inhibits sex hormone production and so has effects similar to castration such as prevention of secondary sexual characteristics development.

Gamete function
After gametes are produced in sexual reproduction, two gametes must combine during fertilization to form a zygote, which again has the full typical number of chromosomes of the species. Methods that target gamete function prevent this fertilization from occurring and are true contraceptives.

Gamete outcome
Shortly after fertilization a zygote develops into a multicellular embryo that in turn develops into a larger organism. In placental mammals this process of gestation occurs inside the reproductive system of the mother of the embryo. Immunity that targets gamete outcome induces abortion of an embryo while it is within its mother's reproductive system.

== Medical use ==
Immunocontraception is not currently available but is under study.

=== Obstacles ===
==== Variability of immunogenicity ====
In order for an immunocontraceptive to be palatable for human use, it would need to meet or exceed the efficacy rates of currently popular forms of contraception. Currently the maximum reduction of fertility due to sperm vaccines in laboratory experiments with mice is ~75%. The lack of efficacy is due to variability of immunogenicity from one animal to another. Even when exposed to the exact same vaccine, some animals will produce abundant antibody titers to the vaccine's antigen, while others produce relatively low antibody titers. In the Eppin trial that attained 100% infertility, a small sample size (only 9 monkeys) was used, and even among this small sample 2 monkeys were dropped from the study because they failed to produce sufficiently high antibody titers.

This trend—high efficacy when antibody titers are above a threshold coupled with variability in how many animals reach such a threshold—is seen throughout immunocontraception and immune-based birth control research. A long-term study of PZP vaccination in deer that spanned 6 years found that infertility was directly related to antibody titers to PZP. The phase II clinical trial of hCG vaccines was quite successful among women who had antibody titers above 50 ng/mL, but quite poor among those with antibody titers below this threshold.

==== Lack of mucosal immunity ====
Mucosal immunity, which includes immune function in the female reproductive tract, is not as well understood as humoral immunity. This may be an issue for certain contraceptive vaccines. For instance, in the second LDH-C_{4} primate trial that had negative results, all of the immunized macaque monkeys developed high antibody titers against LDH-C_{4} in serum, but antibodies against LDH-C_{4} were not found in the monkeys' vaginal fluids. If antibodies against LDH-C_{4} do indeed inhibit fertilization, then this result highlights how the difference in the functioning of mucosal immunity from humoral immunity may be critical to the efficacy of contraceptive vaccines.

== Adverse effects ==
Whenever an immune response is provoked, there is some risk of autoimmunity. Therefore, immunocontraception trials typically check for signs of autoimmune disease. One concern with zona pellucida vaccination, in particular, is that in certain cases it appears to be correlated with ovarian pathogenesis. However, ovarian disease has not been observed in every trial of zona pellucida vaccination, and when observed, has not always been irreversible.

== Gamete production ==
=== Gonadotropin-releasing hormone ===
The production of gametes is induced in both male and female mammals by the same two hormones: follicle-stimulating hormone (FSH) and luteinizing hormone (LH). The production of these in turn is induced by a single releasing hormone, gonadotropin-releasing hormone (GnRH), which has been the focus of most of the research into immunocontraception against gamete production. GnRH is secreted by the hypothalamus in pulses and travels to the anterior pituitary gland through a portal venous system. There it stimulates the production of FSH and LH. FSH and LH travel through the general circulatory system and stimulate the functioning of the gonads, including the production of gametes and the secretion of sex steroid hormones. Immunity against GnRH thus lessens FSH and LH production which in turn attenuates gamete production and secondary sexual characteristics.

While GnRH immunity has been known to have contraceptive effects for some time, only in the 2000s has it been used to develop several commercial vaccines. Equity® Oestrus Control is a GnRH vaccine marketed for use in non-breeding domestic horses. Repro-Bloc is GnRH vaccine marketed for use in domestic animals in general. Improvac® is a GnRH vaccine marketed for use in pigs not as a contraceptive, but as an alternative to physical castration for the control of boar taint. Unlike the other products which are marketed for use in domestic animals, GonaCon™ is a GnRH vaccine being developed as a United States Department of Agriculture initiative for use for control of wildlife, specifically deer. GonaCon has also been used on a trial basis to control kangaroos in Australia.

== Gamete function ==
The form of sexual reproduction practiced by most placental mammals is anisogamous, requiring two kinds of dissimilar gametes, and allogamous, such that each individual only produces one of the two kinds of gametes. The smaller gamete is the sperm cell and is produced by males of the species. The larger gamete is the ovum and is produced by females of the species. Under this scheme, fertilization requires two gametes, one from an individual of each sex, in order to occur. Immunocontraception targeting the female gamete has focused on the zona pellucida. Immunocontraception targeting the male gamete has involved many different antigens associated with sperm function.

=== Zona pellucida ===
The zona pellucida is a glycoprotein membrane surrounding the plasma membrane of an ovum. The zona pellucida's main function in reproduction is to bind sperm. Immunity against zonae pellucidae causes an animal to produce antibodies that themselves are bound by a zona pellucida. Thus when a sperm encounters an ovum in an animal immunized against zonae pellucidae, the sperm cannot bind to the ovum because its zona pellucida has already been occupied by antibodies. Therefore, fertilization does not occur.

==== Early research ====
Work begun by researchers at the University of Tennessee in the 1970s into immunity against zonae pellucidae resulted in its identification as a target antigen for immunocontraception. The zona pellucida's suitability is a result of it being necessary for fertilization and containing at least one antigen that is tissue-specific and not species-specific. The tissue-specificity implies that immunity against zonae pellucidae will not also affect other tissues in the immunized animal's body. The lack of species-specificity implies that zonae pellucidae harvested from animals of one species will induce an immune response in those of another, which makes zona pellucida antigens readily available, since zonae pellucidae can be harvested from farm animals.

==== Zonagen ====
In 1987, a pharmaceutical company called Zonagen (later renamed Repros Therapeutics) was started with the goal of developing zona pellucida vaccines as an alternative to the surgical sterilization of companion animals and eventually as a contraceptive for human use. The products would be based on research being done at the Baylor College of Medicine by Bonnie S. Dunbar that was funded by Zonagen. However, the relationship between Zonagen and Bonnie Dunbar ended acrimoniously in 1993. Despite claims later that year that development of a contraceptive vaccine was imminent and an agreement with Schering AG for funding for joint development of a contraceptive vaccine for human use, no vaccine was made commercially available and the agreement with Schering was terminated after primate studies were disappointing. The company would go on to pursue other projects and be renamed.

==== Application to wildlife population control ====
Also in the late 1980s, research began into the use of vaccines based around zonae pellucidae harvested from pigs for the purpose of wildlife control. Such porcine zona pellucida (PZP) vaccines were tested in captive and domestic horses in 1986 with encouraging results. This led to the first successful field trial of contraceptive vaccines with free-ranging wildlife, which examined PZP vaccines used upon wild horses of Assateague Island National Seashore in 1988. The successful results of the field trial were maintained by annual booster inoculations.

Following the success of trials with horses, initial trials using captive animals showed promise for the use of PZP vaccines with white-tailed deer and with African elephants. This led to successful field trials of PZP vaccines in white-tailed deer at the Smithsonian Conservation Biology Institute in Front Royal, VA from September 1992 to September 1994 and in African elephants of Kruger National Park in South Africa in 1996.

As a result of these successes, PZP vaccination has become the most popular form of immunocontraception for wildlife. As of 2011, thousands of animals are treated with PZP vaccination every year, including 6 different species of free-ranging wildlife in 52 different locations and 76 captive exotic species in 67 different zoological gardens.

==== Bio Farma ====
In 2012, researchers from Brawijaya University in conjunction with pharmaceutical company Bio Farma received a grant from the Indonesian government to develop a zona pellucida contraceptive vaccine for human use. Instead of pigs, the zonae pellucidae for the program are harvested from cows. The program hopes to mass-produce a contraceptive vaccine in Indonesia in 2013 at the earliest.

==== Viral and microbial vectors ====
While contraceptive vaccines can be delivered remotely, they still require administration to each individual animal that is to be made infertile. Thus contraceptive vaccines have been used to control only relatively small populations of wildlife. Australia and New Zealand have large populations of European invasive species for which such approach will not scale. Research in these countries has therefore focused on genetically modifying viruses or microorganisms that infect the unwanted invasive species to contain immunocontraceptive antigens.

Such research has included targeting the European rabbit (Oryctolagus cuniculus) in Australia by engineering rabbit zona pellucida glycoproteins into a recombinant myxoma virus. This approach has induced marginal reduction of fertility in laboratory rabbits with some of the glycoproteins. Further improvement of efficacy is necessary before such an approach is ready for field trials. Research has also targeted the house mouse (Mus domesticus) in Australia by engineering murine zona pellucida antigens into a recombinant ectromelia virus and a recombinant cytomegalovirus. The latter approach has induced permanent infertility when injected into laboratory mice. However, there is some attenuation of efficacy when it is actually transmitted virally.

In addition to rabbits and mice, this approach has been explored for other animals. Researchers have attempted to replicate similar results when targeting the red fox (Vulpes vulpes) in Australia using such vectors as Salmonella typhimurium, vaccinia, and canine herpesvirus, but no reduction in fertility has been achieved thus far for a variety of reasons. Initial exploration into the control of the common brushtail possum (Trichosurus vulpecula) in New Zealand using the nematode Parastrongyloides trichosuri has identified it as a possible immunocontraceptive vector.

=== Sperm ===
In placental mammals, fertilization typically occurs inside the female in the oviducts. The oviducts are positioned near the ovaries where ova are produced. An ovum therefore needs only to travel a short distance to the oviducts for fertilization. In contrast sperm cells must be highly motile, since they are deposited into the female reproductive tract during copulation and must travel through the cervix (in some species) as well as the uterus and the oviduct (in all species) to reach an ovum. Sperm cells that are motile are spermatozoa.

Spermatozoa are protected from the male's immune system by the blood-testis barrier. However, spermatozoa are deposited into the female in semen, which is mostly the secretions of the seminal vesicles, prostate gland, and bulbourethral glands. In this way antibodies generated by the male are deposited into the female along with spermatozoa. Because of this and the extensive travel in the female reproductive tract, spermatozoa are susceptible to anti-sperm antibodies generated by the male in addition to waiting anti-sperm antibodies generated by the female.

==== Early research ====
In 1899, the discovery of the existence of antibodies against sperm was made independently both by Serge Metchnikoff of the Pasteur Institute and by Nobel prize laureate Karl Landsteiner.

In 1929, the first recorded attempt at immunocontraception was made by Morris Baskin, clinical director of the Denver Maternal Hygiene Committee. In this trial 20 women who were known to have at least 1 prior pregnancy were injected with their husband's semen, and no conception was recorded in 1 year of observation of these couples. A United States patent (number 2103240) was issued in 1937 for this approach as a contraceptive, but no product for widespread consumption ever came from this approach.

==== Renewed interest ====
Throughout the 1990s, there was a resurgence of research in immunocontraception targeting sperm with the hope of developing a contraceptive vaccine for human use. Unlike earlier research which explored the contraceptive effect of immune responses to whole sperm cells, contemporary research has focused on searching for specific molecular antigens that are involved with sperm function.

Antigens that have been identified as potential targets for immunocontraception include the sperm-specific peptides or proteins ADAM, LDH-C4, sp10, sp56, P10G, fertilization antigen 1 (FA-1), sp17, SOB2, A9D, CD52, YLP12, Eppin, CatSper, Izumo, sperm associated antigen 9 (SPAG9), 80 kilodalton human sperm antigen (80 kDa HSA), and nuclear autoantigenic sperm protein (tNASP).

Early primate trials had mixed results. One study examined the sperm-specific isozyme of human lactate dehydrogenase (LDH-C_{4}) combined with a T-cell epitope to create a synthetic peptide that acted as a more potent chimeric antigen. Vaccination of female baboons with this synthetic peptide resulted in a reduced fertility in the trial. However, a second study that examined vaccination of female macaque monkeys with the same synthetic peptide did not find reduced fertility.

Since then, a study examining vaccination based on an epididymal protease inhibitor (Eppin) in male macaque monkeys demonstrated that vaccination against sperm antigens could be an effective, reversible contraceptive in male primates. While 4 of 6 control monkeys impregnated females during the trial, none of the 7 monkeys included in the trial that were vaccinated against Eppin impregnated females, and 4 of these 7 vaccinated monkeys recovered their fertility within a year and a half of observation after the trial.

This illustrated that not only could sperm immunocontraception be effective, but it could have several advantages over zona pellucida vaccines. For instance, sperm vaccines could be used by males, in addition to females.

Additionally, while there are relatively few glycoproteins in the zona pellucida and thus relatively few target antigens for zona pellucida vaccines, more than a dozen prospective target antigens for the inhibition of sperm function have been identified. This relative abundance of prospective target antigens makes the prospects of a multivalent vaccine better for sperm vaccines. A study which examined the use of one such multivalent vaccine in female macaque monkeys found that the monkeys produced antibodies against all antigens included in the vaccine, suggesting the efficacy of the multivalent approach.

Finally, while there has been autoimmune ovarian pathogenesis found in some trials using zona pellucida vaccines, anti-sperm antibodies are not likely to have adverse health effects, since anti-sperm antibodies are produced by up to 70% of men who have had vasectomies, and there has been much investigation into possible adverse health side-effects of the vasectomy procedure.

==== Passive immunity ====
A vaccine induces active immunity when antigens are injected into an animal that cause it to produce desired antibodies itself. In passive immunity the desired antibody titers are achieved by injecting antibodies directly into an animal. The efficacy of such an approach for immunocontraception was demonstrated as early as the 1970s with antibodies against zonae pellucidae in mice during the investigation of the mechanism by which such antibodies inhibited fertility. Because the variability of individual immune response is an obstacle to bringing contraceptive vaccines to market, there has been research into the approach of contraception through passive immunization as an alternative that would be of less duration, but be closer to market. Research done using phage display technology on lymphocytes from immunoinfertile men led to the isolation, characterization, and synthesis of specific antibodies that inhibit fertility by acting against several of the known sperm antigens. This detailed molecular knowledge of antisperm antibodies may be of use in the development of a passive immunocontraceptive product.

== Gamete outcome ==
=== Human chorionic gonadotropin ===
Most of the research into immunity that inhibits gamete outcome has focused on human chorionic gonadotropin (hCG). hCG is not necessary for fertilization, but is secreted by embryos shortly thereafter. Therefore, immunity against hCG does not prevent fertilization. However, it was found that anti-hCG antibodies prevent marmoset embryos from implanting in the endometrium of their mother's uterus.

The main function of hCG is to sustain the ovarian corpus luteum during pregnancy past the time it would normally decay as part of the regular menstrual cycle. For the first 7–9 weeks in humans, the corpus luteum secretes the progesterone necessary to maintain the viability of the endometrium for pregnancy. Therefore, immunity against hCG during this time frame would function as an abortifacient, as confirmed by experiments in baboons. In the scientific literature the more inclusive term "birth control vaccine" rather than "contraceptive vaccine" is used to refer to hCG vaccines.

==== Clinical trials ====
Research begun in the 1970s led to clinical trials in humans of a hCG birth control vaccine. A phase I (safety) clinical trial examined 15 women from clinics in Helsinki, Finland, Uppsala, Sweden, Bahia, Brazil, and Santiago, Chile with a vaccine formed by conjugating the beta subunit of hCG with a tetanus toxoid. The women had previously had tubal ligations. In the trial the immune response was reversible and no significant health issues were found.

This was followed by another phase I trial in 1977-1978 examining previously sterilized women at 5 institutions in India with a more potent vaccine that combined the beta subunit of hCG with the alpha subunit of ovine luteinizing hormone to form a heterospecies dimer conjugated with both tetanus toxoid and diphtheria toxoid. The multiple carriers were used because it was found that a small percentage of women acquired carrier-specific immunosuppression due to repeated injection of conjugates with the same carrier.

This more potent version of the vaccine was used in a phase II (efficacy) trial during 1991-1993 conducted at 3 locations: the All India Institute of Medical Sciences, Safdarjung Hospital in New Delhi, and the Post Graduate Institute of Medical Education and Research in Chandigarh. Primary immunization consisted of 3 injections at 6 week intervals, and 148 women known to be previously fertile completed primary immunization. All women generated antibodies against hCG, but only 119 (80%) generated antibody titers clearly above 50 ng/mL, which was the estimated level for efficacy. Blood samples were taken twice a month, and booster injections were given when antibody titers declined below 50 ng/mL in women who wished to continue using the vaccine. At the completion of the study after 1224 menstrual cycles observed, only 1 pregnancy occurred in a woman having an antibody titer level above 50 ng/mL, and 26 pregnancies occurred among women who had titers below 50 ng/mL.

==== Application to cancer therapy ====
Following these clinical trails of hCG vaccination as a birth control method, hCG was discovered to be expressed in certain kinds of malignant neoplasms, including breast cancer, adenocarcinoma of the prostate, progressive vulvar carcinoma, carcinoma of the bladder, pancreatic adenocarcinoma, cervical carcinoma, gastric carcinoma, squamous-cell carcinoma of the oral cavity and oropharynx, lung carcinoma, and colorectal cancer. Therefore, immunity against hCG has applications such as imaging of cancer cells, selective delivery of cytotoxic compounds to tumor cells, and in at least one case, direct therapeutic effect by preventing establishment, inhibiting the growth, and causing the necrosis of tumors. This has led to interest in developing hCG vaccines specifically for cancer treatment.

==== Ongoing research ====
The vaccine tested in the phase II clinical trial in India did not proceed further because it produced antibody titers of 50 ng/mL for at least 3 months duration in only 60% of women in the trial. Ongoing research in hCG birth control vaccines has focused on improving immunogenicity. A vaccine in which the beta subunit of hCG is fused to the B subunit of Escherichia coli heat-labile enterotoxin has been effective in laboratory mice. It has been approved by the Indian National Review Committee on Genetic Manipulation and is being produced for pre-clinical toxicology testing. If it is determined to be safe, it is planned for clinical trials.

== Wildlife control ==
Immunocontraception is one of the few alternatives to lethal methods for the direct control of wildlife populations. While there was research into the use of hormonal contraception for wildlife control as early as the 1950s that produced pharmacologically effective products, they all proved to be ineffective for wildlife control for a variety of practical reasons. Field trials of immunocontraception in wildlife, on the other hand, established that contraceptive vaccines could be delivered remotely by capture gun, were safe to use in pregnant animals, were reversible, and induced long-lasting infertility, overcoming these practical limitations.

One concern about the use of hormonal contraceptives in general, but especially in wildlife, is that the sex steroid hormones that are used are easily passed, often via the food chain, from animal to animal. This can lead to unintended ecological consequences. For instance, fish exposed to treated human sewage effluents were found to have concentrations of the synthetic hormone levonorgestrel in blood plasma higher than those found in humans taking hormonal contraceptives. Because the antigens used in contraceptive vaccines are protein, not steroids, they are not easily passed from animal to animal without loss of function.
