= Lowey =

Lowey is a surname. Notable people with the surname include:

- Daniel Lowey (1875–1951), Olympic Tug of War competitor
- Edmund Lowey (born 1938), Member of the Legislative Council in the Isle of Man
- Hans Lowey, Austrian-American chemist
- John Lowey (disambiguation), multiple people
- Nita Lowey (born 1937), politician from the U.S. state of New York
- Susan Lowey, American biophysicist

== See also ==
- Lowey of Tonbridge, the large tract of land given to Richard Fitz Gilbert (1024–1090), in West Kent, England by William the Conqueror after the Norman conquest of England.
