= Allergan =

American pharmaceutical company

Allergan plc
- Type: Subsidiary
- Traded as: NYSE: AGN
- Industry: Pharmaceuticals
- Predecessors: Allergan, Inc. and Actavis before the 2015 tax inversion and merger
- Founded: May 16, 2013; 13 years ago, upon the combination of Allergan Finance, LLC (Actavis) & Warner Chilcott; March 17, 2015; 11 years ago renamed to Allergan Plc upon the merger of Allergan, Inc and Actavis
- Headquarters: Clonshaugh Business & Technology Park, Coolock, D17 E400, Dublin, Ireland
- Number of locations: 40 manufacturing facilities, 27 global R&D centres and marketing/sales facilities worldwide.
- Area served: ~100 countries
- Products: Branded pharmaceuticals
- Revenue: ▲$16.089 billion (2019)
- Net income: ▼ -$5.142 billion (2018)
- Total assets: ▼$94.699 billion (2019)
- Total equity: ▼$58.195 billion (2019)
- Number of employees: 17,800 (2018)
- Parent: AbbVie
- Website: www.allergan.com

Allergan plc is an American, Irish-domiciled pharmaceutical company that acquires, develops, manufactures and markets brand name drugs and medical devices in the areas of medical aesthetics, eye care, central nervous system, and gastroenterology. The company is the maker of Botox.

Allergan plc was formed in March 2015 when Irish–registered Actavis plc acquired U.S.–registered Allergan, Inc., and assumed the Allergan name. In 2016, Allergan sold its generic drugs business, Actavis, to Teva Pharmaceuticals for $40.5 billion.

In June 2019, U.S. pharmaceutical company AbbVie announced it had reached an agreement to acquire Allergan for $63 billion. The merged company would be domiciled in the U.S. for tax purposes. On May 8, 2020 the merger was completed.

== Locations ==
Allergan's global headquarters are located in Dublin, Ireland. The company also maintains a significant presence in the United States, with administrative and operational headquarters located in various locations across the country, including Irvine, California and Madison, New Jersey.

== History ==
Allergan plc was created from the 2015 merger and Irish corporate tax inversion of two companies, Irish-based Actavis plc and U.S.-based Allergan, Inc.

=== Allergan, Inc. ===
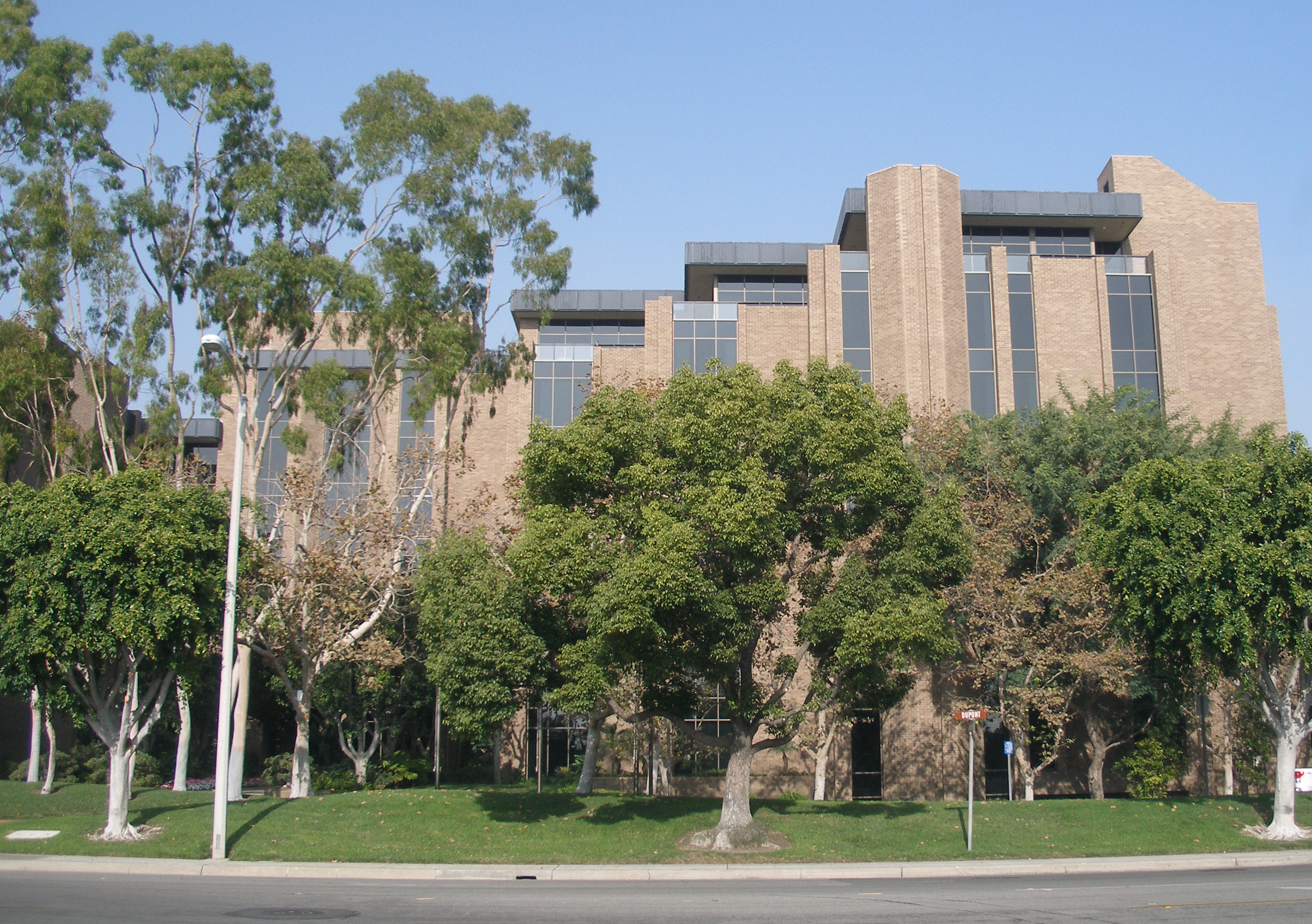
Allergan, Inc. headquarters in Irvine, California

In 1948, pharmacist Gavin S. Herbert founded Allergan Pharmaceuticals, Inc. In 1970, Allergan, Inc. became a public company via an initial public offering. In 1977, Allergan announced plans to build a factory in Westport, Ireland.

In 1980, it was acquired by SmithKline Corporation for $259 million and was later spun-off by SmithKline Beecham in 1989. In 1989, Allergan opened a manufacturing plant in Waco, Texas, to manufacture eye care products.

In 1991, Allergan acquired the company Oculinum which manufactured products for eye muscle disorders. Following the acquisition, the product was renamed Botox. In 1996, Allergan received FDA approval for Alphagan ophthalmic solution for open-angle glaucoma and ocular hypertension. In 1998, Allergan established The Allergan Foundation, a private US-based charitable foundation.

In 2005, Allergan acquired Inamed which had a licensing agreement with Corneal Group Laboratoires for Juvederm products. In 2006, Allergan gained rights to Juvederm products.

=== Actavis plc ===
In the spring of 1983, colleagues Allen Chao and David Hsia formed Watson Pharmaceuticals, a drug development in Libertyville, Illinois. In late fall of 1983, the company moved to Corona, California, and began to develop and manufacture generic pharmaceuticals. In February 1993, the company became a public company via an initial public offering.

In 2011, the company moved its corporate headquarters from Corona, California, to Parsippany-Troy Hills, New Jersey. On October 31, 2012, Watson acquired Actavis for €4.25 billion and took the Actavis name. In 2013, Actavis acquired Irish-registered Warner Chilcott for $5 billion and used the transaction to execute a corporate tax inversion to Ireland. In 2014, Actavis acquired Forest Laboratories for $25 billion.

=== Acquisition by Actavis plc (2015–2019) ===
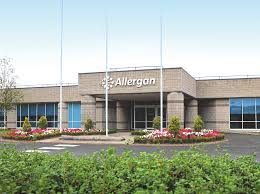
Allergan plc headquarters in Ireland

In 2015, Irish-based Actavis plc acquired U.S.-based Allergan, Inc., for $70 billion, and in effect redomiciled Allergan to Ireland in a corporate tax inversion. Actavis CEO Brent Saunders became the CEO of the combined company. In June 2015, the company took the Allergan name.

As of 2020, the company operated four facilities in Ireland.

==== 2015 ====
On July 7, 2015, the company acquired the rights to the late stage CGRP migraine portfolio of Merck & Co, as well as two experimental drugs for an upfront payment of $250 million. Later that summer, the company acquired Oculeve for $125 million and Naurex for an upfront payment of $560 million. In October 2015, the company acquired AqueSys, developer of ocular implants for an initial payment of $300 million, along with Kythera Biopharmaceuticals, a company focused on the medical aesthetics market, for $2.1 billion.

In late 2015, the company announced the acquisition of Northwood Medical Innovation, the developer of earFold. On November 25, 2015, the company announced it would partner with Rugen Therapeutic to develop new therapies for autism spectrum disorder and obsessive compulsive disorder.

==== Abandon merger with Pfizer ====
On November 23, 2015, Allergan and Pfizer announced their intention to merge in a $160 billion transaction. On April 5, 2016, after the Obama administration announced its plan to ban tax inversions, Pfizer terminated the acquisition and paid Allergan a $150 million breakup fee.

==== 2016 ====
In April 2016, the company announced it would partner with Heptares Therapeutics to develop a subtype-selective muscarinic agonists for Alzheimer's disease and announced the acquisition of Topokine Therapeutics, gaining the phase IIb/III compound XAF5 - a treatment for dermatochalasis.

In August 2016, Allergan plc sold its generic drugs business to Teva Pharmaceutical Industries in a $40.5 billion deal and announced the acquisition of ForSight VISION5 for more than $95 million.

In September 2016, CEO Saunders announced what he called a social contract to limit prices on the company's medications. That same month, the company acquired RetroSense Therapeutics for more than $60 million, announced the acquisition of Tobira Therapeutics for approximately $1.7 billion and, a day later, the acquisition of Akarna Therapeutics for $50 million.

In October 2016, the company sold Anda, its generic drug distribution business, to Teva for $500 million and acquired Vitae Pharmaceuticals, focused on dermatology treatments, for $639 million. That same month, the company announced it would acquire Motus Therapeutics, a developer of treatments for gastrointestinal disorders, for $200 million. On November 22, 2016, the company acquired Chase Pharmaceuticals for $125 million.

==== 2017-2020 ====
In 2017, the company acquired LifeCell, a specialist in regenerative medicine, for $2.9 billion and Zeltique Aesthetics, maker of CoolSculpting, for $2.4 billion. On June 7, the company announced the acquisition of Keller Medical, a company that manufactures devices for use during breast augmentation surgery. On December 12, the company announced the acquisition of Repros Therapeutics, a developer of drugs for reproductive system diseases.

In September 2018, Allergan acquired the aesthetic company, Bonti, for $195 million.

In March 2019, the company acquired Envy Medical, Inc. As of 2019, Allergan's Botox product had annual sales of nearly $4 billion.

In 2018, along with several other drug manufacturers and distributors, the company was sued by several municipalities and states in the U.S. due to the manufacture of opioids, which have been abused in what has been referred to as the opioid epidemic.

=== Acquisition by AbbVie Inc. (2019-present) ===
In June 2019, U.S. pharmaceutical company AbbVie announced it had reached an agreement to acquire Allergan for $63 billion, which would return Allergan to the U.S. for tax purposes. On the announcement of the transaction, Abbvie disclosed that its 2019 net effective tax rate was 9%, but that post the acquisition, the Group's effective tax rate would rise to 13%. The merger was expected to close in 2020 and was completed on May 8, 2020.

=== Acquisition history ===
Illustration of the company's mergers, acquisitions, spin-offs and historical predecessors

- Allergan, plc (formerly known as Actavis until June 2015 when it adopted Allergan's name. Acquired by Abbvie June 2019)
  - - Actavis plc
      - Auden Mckenzie Holdings Limited
        (Acq 2015)
      - - Durata Therapeutics
          (Acq 2014)
        - Silom Medical Company
          (Acq 2014)
        - - Forest Laboratories (Acq 2014)
            - - Aptalis Pharma
                - Axcan Pharma
                - Eurand Pharmaceuticals
            - Furiex Pharmaceuticals Inc
              (Acq 2014)
          - - Galen
              (Acq 2013)
            - Uteron Pharma, S.A.
              (Acq 2013)
            - Warner Chilcott Plc
              (Acq 2000)
            - Procter & Gamble
              (Prescription drug div, Acq 2009)
            - - Watson Pharmaceuticals
              - - Andrx Corporation
                  (Acq 2006)
                - Arrow Group
                  (Acq 2009)
                - Eden Biodesign
                - Specifar Pharmaceuticals S.A.
                  (Acq 2011)
                - Ascent Pharmahealth Ltd
                  (Acq 2012)
                - Actavis Group
                  (Acq 2012)
    - Allergan, inc
      - Kythera Biopharmaceuticals
        (Acq 2015)
      - - MAP Pharmaceuticals Inc
          (Acq 2013)
        - - Inamed Corporation
            (Acq 2006)
          - - Allergan
              (Advanced Medical Optics spun off in 2006)
            - Janssen-Ortho
              Spun off in 2006
            - Abbott Laboratories
              Acq 2007
  - Allergan, plc
    - Envy Medical, Inc.
      (Acq 2019)
    - - Repros Therapeutics
        (Acq 2017)
      - - Keller Medical, Inc
          (Acq 2017)
        - - Zeltiq Aesthetics Inc.
            (Acq 2017)
          - - LifeCell
              (Acq 2016)
            - - Chase Pharmaceuticals
                (Acq 2016)
              - - Motus Therapeutics
                  (Acq 2016)
                - - Akarna Therapeutics
                    (Acq 2016)
                  - - RetroSense Therapeutics
                      (Acq 2016)
                    - - ForSight VISION5
                        (Acq 2016)
                      - - Tobira Therapeutics
                          (Acq 2016)
                        - - Vitae Pharmaceuticals, Inc
                            (Acq 2016)
                          - - Topokine Therapeutics
                              (Acq 2016)
                            - - Northwood Medical Innovation Ltd
                                (Acq 2015)
                              - - AqueSys
                                  (Acq 2015)
                                - - Naurex Inc
                                    (Acq 2015)
                                  - - Oculeve, Inc
                                      (Acq 2015)

== Products ==
Allergan acquires, develops, manufactures and markets branded products in four therapeutic areas: medical aesthetics, eye care, central nervous system, and gastroenterology. The company manufactures several pharmaceutical products including Botox (botulinum toxin), Juvederm (injectable filler), CoolSculpting (cryolipolysis), Alphagan (brimonidine), Vraylar (cariprazine), Linzess (linaclotide), and Ubrelvy (ubrogepant).

== See also ==
- Biotech and pharmaceutical companies in the New York metropolitan area
- The St. Regis Mohawk Tribe and Restasis patent
- Corporate tax inversion
- Ireland as a tax haven
