= Far from the Tree =

2012 non-fiction book by Andrew Solomon

- First edition
- Author: Andrew Solomon
- Language: English
- Publisher: Scribner
- Publication date: October 1, 2013
- Publication place: United States
- Pages: 962
- Awards: National Book Critics Circle Award (2012) for nonfiction
- ISBN: 0-7432-3671-8

Far From the Tree: Parents, Children, and the Search for Identity is a non-fiction book by Andrew Solomon published in November 2012 in the United States and two months later in the UK (under the title, Far from the Tree: A Dozen Kinds of Love), about how families accommodate children with physical, mental and social disabilities and differences.

The writing of the book was supported by art colony residencies at Yaddo, MacDowell Colony, Ucross Foundation, and the Rockefeller Foundation Bellagio Center; at MacDowell, Solomon was the DeWitt Wallace/Reader's Digest Fellow and later the Stanford Calderwood fellow.

In 2017 it was adapted into a documentary of the same name, directed by Rachel Dretzin. The film uncritically depicts uses of the pseudoscientific rapid prompting method as an intervention for a child with non-speaking autism.

== Awards and honors ==
- 2012 Time magazine's Best Books of the Year
- 2012 The New York Times Ten Best Books.
- 2012 Lambda Literary Award, nominee.
- 2012 National Book Critics Circle Award for Nonfiction, winner.
- 2012 Media for a Just Society Award of the National Council on Crime and Delinquency
- 2013 Samuel Johnson Prize for Non-fiction, longlist.
- 2013 Anisfield-Wolf Book Award, winner.
- 2013 Dayton Literary Peace Prize, winner.
- 2013 J. Anthony Lukas Book Prize, winner.
- 2013 National Multiple Sclerosis Society Books for a Better Life Award.
- 2013 New Atlantic Independent Booksellers Association (NAIBA) Book of the Year Award for Nonfiction.
- 2013 Green Carnation Prize, shortlist.
- 2014 Wellcome Book Prize, winner.
- 2024 #67, The New York Times 100 Best Books of the 21st century.

== See also ==
- Welcome to Holland (essay)
