= Maria Elvira Méndez Pinedo =

Icelandic academic

- Occupation: Professor
- Organization: University of Iceland

Maria Elvira Méndez Pinedo is a Spanish-Icelandic legal scholar, who specialises in European Union and European Economic Area law. She has been full tenured professor of European law at the University of Iceland since 2010. She has been working for the Faculty of Law since 2007 (Lektor – assistant professor) and was promoted to associate professor (Dósent) in 2009.

== Education ==
Méndez-Pinedo studied law at the University Complutense of Madrid (1989 Licenciatura de Derecho) and at the Université Paris Sorbonne (Paris II –Assas) (1990 D.E.A. de Droit Communautaire) and McGeorge School of Law (1991. Diploma of International Legal Studies). She earned a Ph.D. in 1997 from Universidad de Alcalá de Henares (Madrid, Spain) (Doctora en Derecho cum laude).

== Career ==
In parallel to an academic career, Méndez-Pinedo has relevant experience as a legal expert. She did legal internships in Allergan Inc. (Irvine, California, United States), DG Research and Studies - European Parliament (Luxembourg), Izod & Evans law firm (London, UK). She has worked in the field of European law and policy for the European Commission in Luxembourg and for other private firms. She is Member of the Editorial Board of the legal journal Derecho y Economía de la Integración (University of Alcalá, Spain) and Member of the Advisory Board of the Nordic Journal of European Law (University of Lund, Sweden and other Nordic Universities). She is often consulted by Spanish, Icelandic and international media as a specialist in European law and as a witness of current economic, social and political events taking place in Iceland.

== Research ==
Méndez-Pinedo has written several books and many articles exploring the general authority and effectiveness of EU and EEA law over national (constitutional) laws and the protection of consumer rights in the European internal market, before and after the financial crisis. Her main focus and perspective is to test whether individual rights given by the European legal system are fully respected and enforced for the by judicial and administrative authorities at national level (law in action vs. law in books).

In 2023, she published "Reconceptualizing the Primacy–Supremacy Debate in EU Law" in Revista de Derecho Comunitario, examining resistance to EU law's primacy by high constitutional courts in several EU member states.

=== Selected works - books ===
- The authority of European law. Exploring primacy of EU law and effect of EEA law from European and Icelandic perspectives, together with co-author Ólafur Ísberg Hannesson (Ph.D. European University Institute), 287 pages, Law Institute, University of Iceland, 2012. Research project financed by the Icelandic Research Fund RANNÍS for the period 2010-2012. 2)
- EC and EEA law: A comparative study of the effectiveness of European Law, Europa Law Publishing, Holland, September 2009, 341 p. This book studies why EC law (now EU law) and EEA law provide a more effective judicial protection of individual rights than classic international law. The study focuses on the classic principles of EC/EU law: primacy, direct effect, indirect effect and State liability for breaches of European law as created by the jurisprudence of the European Court of Justice. It aims to determine whether these principles have been incorporated into the EEA legal system in order to provide EEA citizens and economic operators with comparable European rights. The jurisprudence of the EFTA Court is examined in order to cast light on a silent revolution which has taken place in the European landscape: the principle of effectiveness of European law.
- The solution of cross-border consumer claims: the Achilles’ heel of the European Union, edited by the City of Madrid and the Bar Association of Lawyers of Madrid, Spain, January 2002, 187 p. Prologue by the Major of the City and the President of the Bar Association. This book won a research prize organized by these institutions, enjoyed extraordinary attention by the lawyers and made a high impact at the time within the academic field of European law.
- Protection of Consumers in the European Union. Towards a Common Procedural Consumer law, published by the legal publisher Marcial Pons, Madrid, Spain, 1998, 454 p. This is a legal monography based on her doctoral thesis on access to justice for consumers on cross-border claims.

A sample of her research dealing with the primacy and authority of European law is published by the Max Planck Encyclopedia of Comparative Constitutional law (Oxford constitutional law series online).

Her research connected to the Icelandic economic and Icelandic crisis in 2008 and its impact on mortgage creditors is listed at the site of the conference organised by the University of Iceland in 2018.
