= Watson Labs =

Watson Labs may refer to:

- Thomas J. Watson Research Center, IBM Research Division headquarters
- Watson Pharmaceuticals, American pharmaceutical company
