= The Noonday Demon =

Book by Andrew Solomon

The Noonday Demon: An Atlas of Depression
- Authors: Andrew Solomon
- Cover artist: Goya - A Giant Seated in a Landscape
- Language: English
- Subject: major depressive disorder
- Genre: nonfiction
- Publisher: Simon & Schuster
- Publication date: 2001
- ISBN: 9780684854663
- OCLC: 45806437

The Noonday Demon: An Atlas of Depression is a memoir written by Andrew Solomon and first published under the Scribner imprint of New York's Simon & Schuster publishing house in 2001. There was a later paperback under the Touchstone imprint. The Noonday Demon examines the personal, cultural, and scientific aspects of depression through Solomon's published interviews with depression sufferers, doctors, research scientists, politicians, and pharmaceutical researchers. It is an outgrowth of Solomon's 1998 New Yorker article on depression.

== Reception ==
The Noonday Demon received positive critical response, being described by The New York Times as "a book of remarkable scope, depth, breadth, and vitality." The book was honored in 2001 with the National Book Award for Nonfiction and the Lambda Literary Award for autobiography or memoir. In 2002 it was a finalist for the Pulitzer Prize for General Nonfiction.

In 2019, the memoir was ranked 23rd on The Guardian's list of the 100 best books of the 21st century.

== Updated edition ==
A new edition was published by Charles Scribner's Sons in 2015 that added a chapter about new treatments for depression. The update was mentioned during an NPR Fresh Air interview with Solomon and a New York Times article he authored.
