= The St. Regis Mohawk Tribe and Restasis patent =

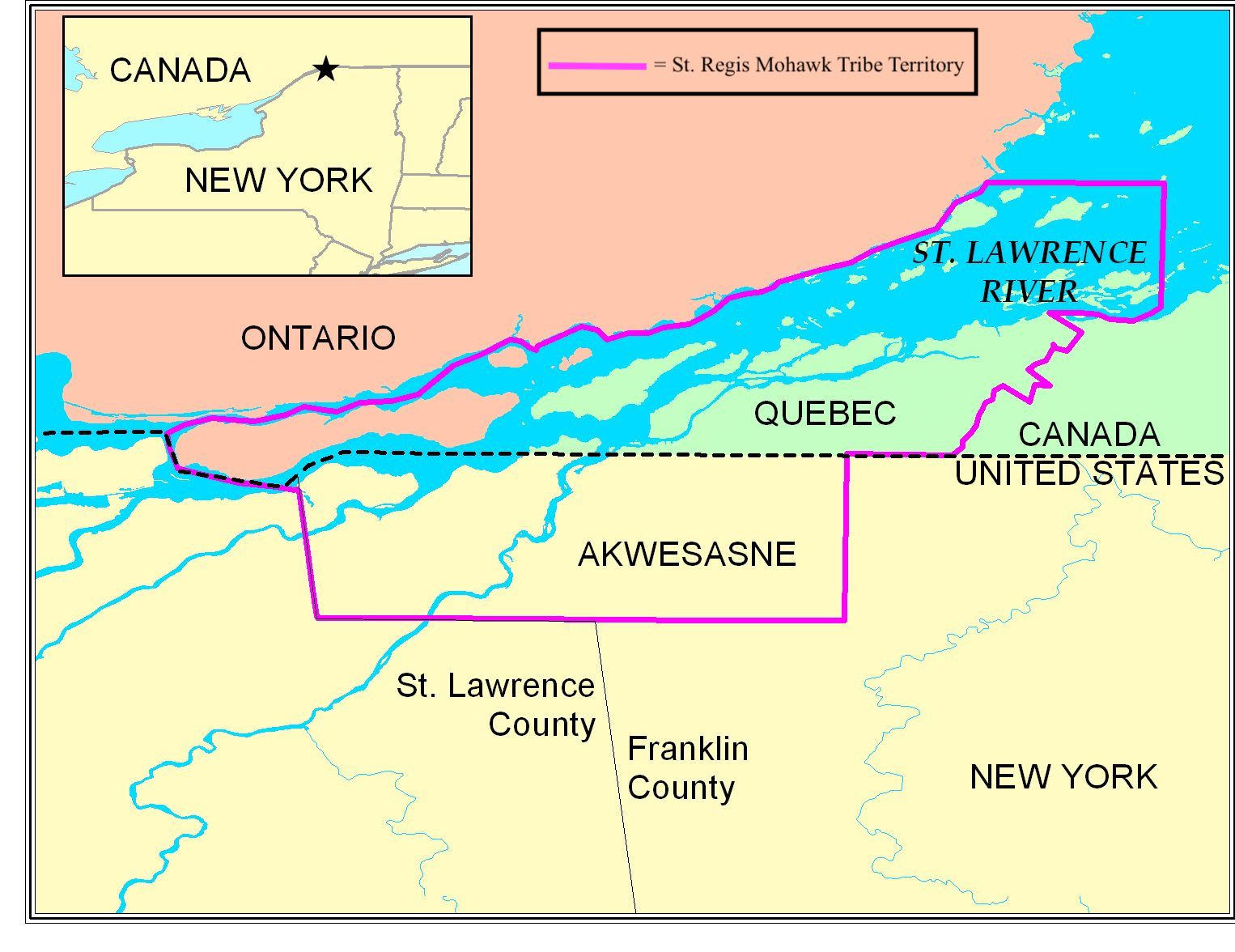
Location of the St. Regis Mohawk Tribe

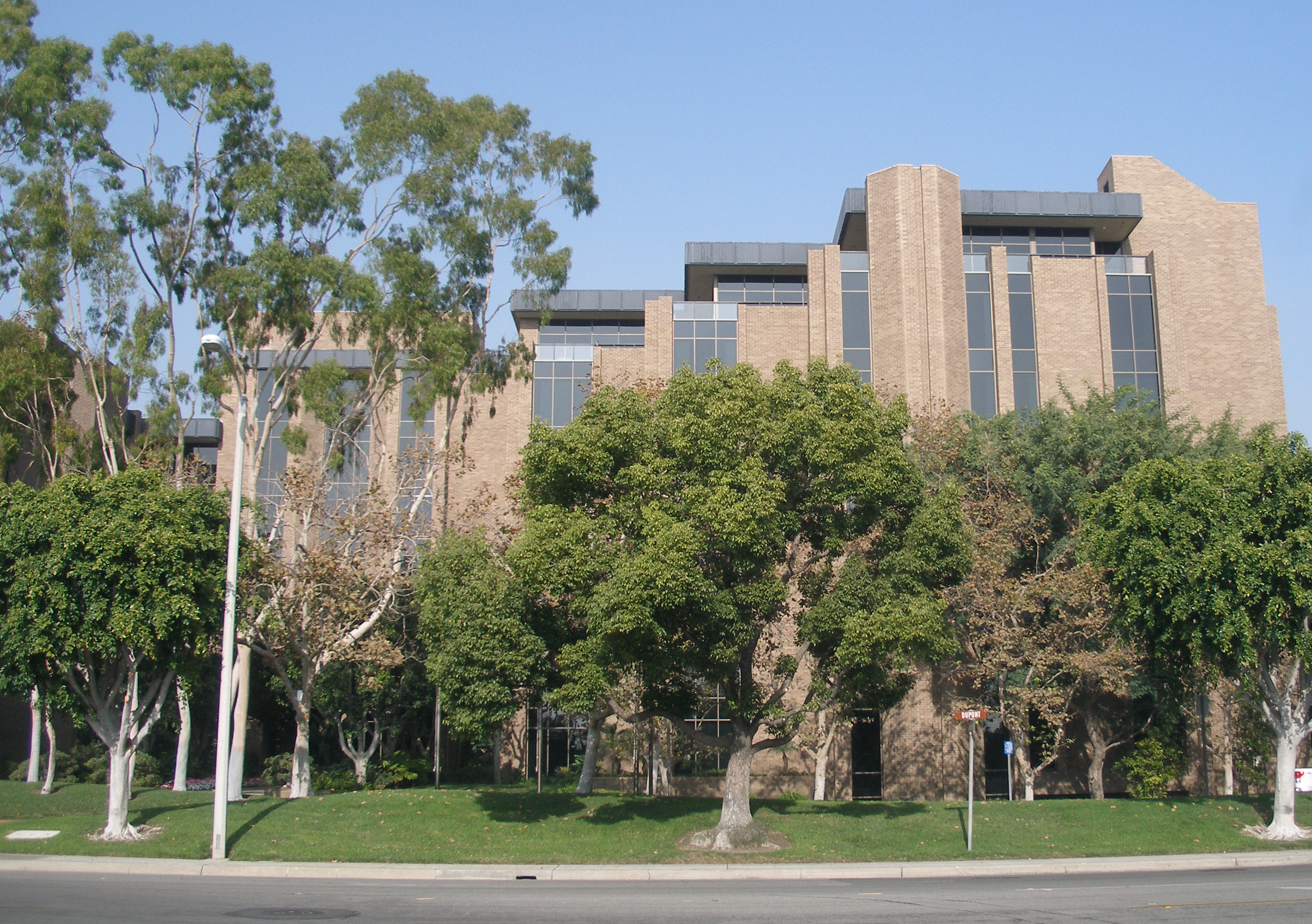
Allergan Headquarters in Irvine, CA

Saint Regis Mohawk Tribe v. Mylan Pharms. Inc., 896 F.3d 1322 (Fed. Cir. 2018) is a United States Patent case, decided by the CAFC, deciding whether or not Indigenous tribes' sovereign immunity extended to patent lawsuits. In September 2017, the American pharmaceutical company Allergan agreed to transfer six pharmaceutical patents for the ophthalmic form of the drug Restasis to the St. Regis tribe of the Mohawk people. At the time, the St. Regis tribe viewed this blockbuster deal as a new, viable supply of income outside of their primary source, the gambling industry. Following the deal, Allergan received an onslaught of criticism from outside companies and politicians such as Rep. Trey Gowdy, chairman of the Committee on Oversight and Government Reform, who said that the deal, "'impair[s] competition across the pharmaceutical industry.'"

== Case details ==
In 2017, Texas intellectual property lawyer Michael Shore claimed that the principle of sovereign immunity applied to Inter partes review, which gives sovereign entities legal immunity to administrative patent challenges in front of the patent trial and appeal board (PTAB). Following this development, the Saint Regis Mohawk Tribe made the decision to reach out to Allergan, whose patents covering Restasis were the subject of both a federal district court lawsuit and 18 pending inter partes review proceedings in front of PTAB, regarding a patent-transfer deal. On September 8, 2017, the St. Regis Mohawk Tribe and Allergan executed a deal that officially transferred patent ownership to the tribe. The agreement guaranteed that Allergan has license to the patents at an annual royalty rate of $15 million per year in addition to an up-front charge that amounted to $13.75 million. This was a landmark deal, as never before had a Native American tribe been given full ownership of a patent by way of a major American corporation.

Soon after the deal was struck between Allergan and the St. Regis Mohawk Tribe, several generic drug companies began the process of filing cases against Allergan regarding the deal. The generic drug companies challenged both the validity of the Restasis patents and the St. Regis Mohawk Tribe's ability to protect the patents with sovereign immunity. A court hearing was arranged and held on February 23, 2018 to decide the fate of the deal.

== Case verdict ==
On February 23, 2018, the U.S. Patent and Trademark Office deemed the Restasis patents invalid and rejected the St Regis Tribe's ability to use sovereign immunity to protect the Restasis patents. Following the announcement, both Allergan and the St. Regis Mohawk Tribe appealed the ruling. PTAB defended their decision by arguing the exclusive licenses sold back to Allergan were so significant that the Saint Regis Mohawk Tribe was essentially giving ownership back. Despite how Allergan and the Saint Regis Mohawk Tribe characterized the sale of the patents, PTAB deemed Allergan as the creator of the patent and therefore the primary owner which invalidated any sovereign immunity the Saint Regis Mohawk Tribe had over Restasis patents. The nullifying of the patent deal between Allergan and the St. Regis Mohawk Tribe effectively closed a loophole in the Hatch-Waxman Act that could have been opened by the deal. The Hatch-Waxman Act prevents pharmaceutical companies from having exclusive rights to a particular drug. The act allows and makes it easier for generic versions of drugs to be made, preventing unaffordable drug prices. If the deal was passed, other pharmaceutical companies could have exploited the loophole and partnered with other sovereign entities such as tribes or state universities in order to maintain exclusivity to drug patents. With this exploitation of the Hatch-Waxman Act, generic medication would not be able to hit the market. Since branded drugs usually lose more than 40% of their value when generic counterparts hit the market, this deal likely would have led to an increase in drug prices across the pharmaceutical industry.

== Aftermath ==
Following the court hearing, Allergan and the St. Regis Mohawk Tribe referenced the Collateral Order Doctrine in court to appeal the case verdict prior to a final decision. A stay (a pause in legal proceedings) was placed on the review of the Restasis patents by PTAB. The stay was granted to Allergan and the St. Regis Mohawk Tribe immediately after the court appeal on the application of sovereign immunity to the Restasis patents. The appeals court heard oral arguments for the protection of the Restasis patents. The Supreme Court issued a final verdict in the case in April 2019 that the Restasis patents cannot have sovereign protection from IPR. It is expected that generic versions of the Restasis drug will hit the market. Wall Street analyst Ronny Gal predicts that the Restasis drug "will lose half its revenue this year".
