= Howard Solomon =

American businessman (1927–2022)

Martin Howard Solomon (August 12, 1927 – January 8, 2022) was an American businessman who was a partner at Hildred Capital Partners and the head of Forest Laboratories, a pharmaceutical company. He was also the father of novelist and writer Andrew Solomon, and David Solomon, his partner at Hildred Capital.

Solomon served on the board of the New York City Ballet from 2013 to at least 2020.

== Life and career ==
Solomon died at his home in Bedford Hills, New York, on January 8, 2022, at the age of 94.
