= Allergan, Inc. =

Former American conglomerate

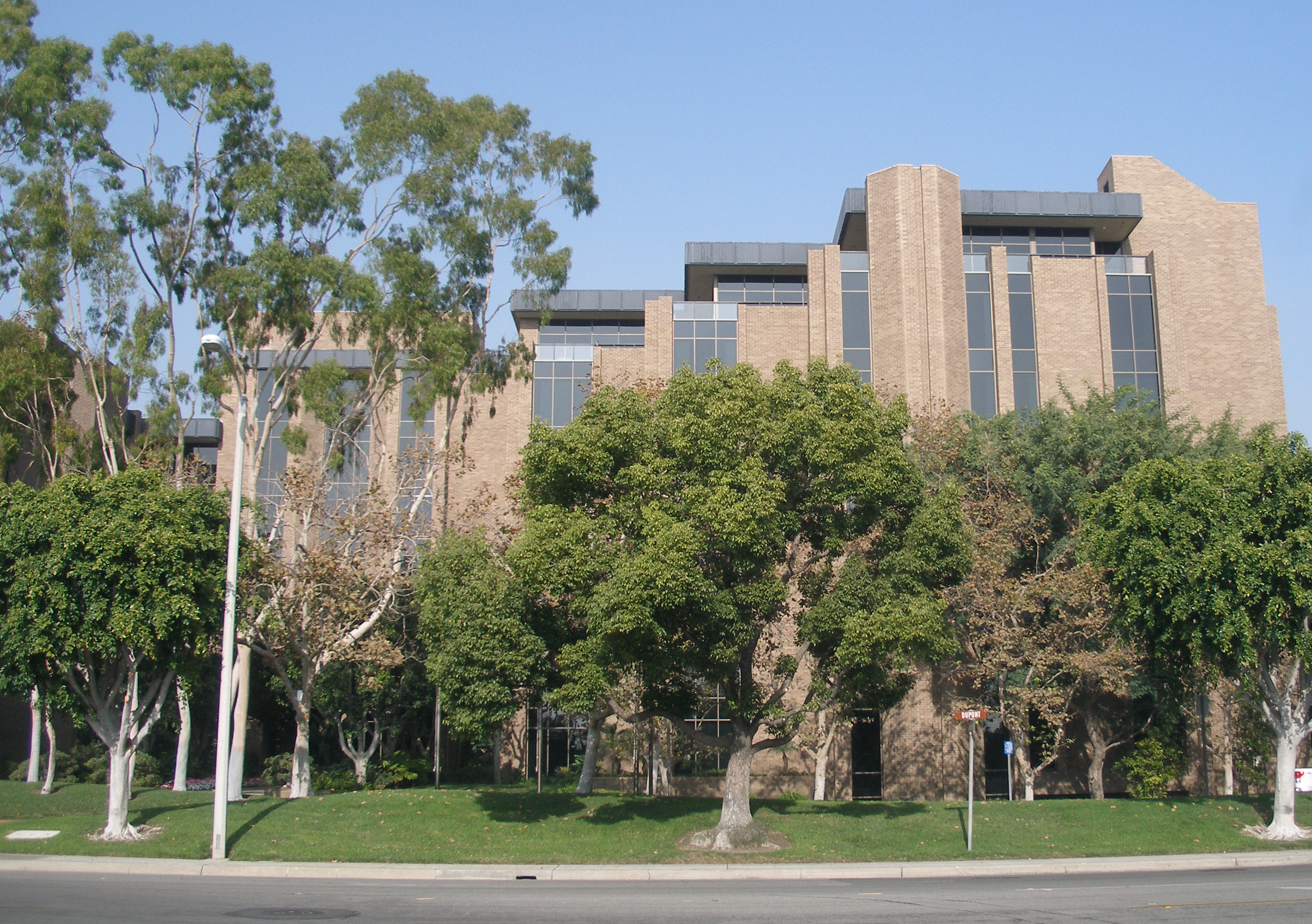
- Allergan headquarters in Irvine
- Company type: Public
- Traded as: NYSE: AGN
- Industry: Pharmaceuticals
- Founded: 1948; 78 years ago
- Defunct: 2015
- Fate: Acquired by Actavis plc in 2015, who then renamed the group as Allergan plc
- Successor: Actavis
- Headquarters: Irvine, California, U.S.
- Area served: Over 100 Countries
- Key people: Paul Bisaro (executive chairman)
- Products: Eye care, neurosciences, medical dermatology, medical aesthetics, breast enhancement, obesity intervention and urologics
- Revenue: $6.2 billion (2013)
- Number of employees: 11400 (2013)
- Parent: Allergan plc
- Website: www.allergan.com

Allergan, Inc. was an American global pharmaceutical company focused on eye care, neurosciences, medical dermatology, medical aesthetics, breast enhancement, obesity intervention and urologics. Allergan, Inc. was formed in 1948, incorporated in 1950 and became a public company in 1970. It ceased operation in 2015 when it was acquired by Irish-based Actavis plc (itself a 2013 U.S. tax inversion to Ireland), who then renamed the group as Allergan plc.

== Early history ==
The company traces its roots back to 1948 and pharmacist Gavin S. Herbert, who in 1950 established Allergan Pharmaceuticals, Inc. Allergan focused on the discovery and development of novel formulations for specialty markets, as well as intimate collaboration with physicians and the scientific community. 1953 saw Allergan producing eye drops and formulating new products such as the first cortisone eye drop to treat allergic inflammation and the first ophthalmic steroid decongestant.

== Acquisitions ==
Allergan became a publicly traded company in 1970 and was acquired by SmithKline for $259 million in 1980. After generating $756 million in revenue and $80 million in profit in 1988, Allergan was spun-off by SmithKline Beckman in 1989.

In July 2002, the Allergan ophthalmic surgical and contact lens care businesses were spun-off to create a new company, Advanced Medical Optics. In 2003, Allergan's flagship product, Botox, was the focus of a high-profile lawsuit and media scrutiny. In March 2006, Allergan acquired Inamed Corporation for $3 billion.

On March 1, 2013, the company acquired MAP Pharmaceuticals Inc., a development-stage company mainly researching the treatment of migraine and other oral drugs in Neurology for approximately $958 million. The principal products of this sub-company are under review with the US Food and Drug Administration (FDA). In December 2013, the company sold its obesity intervention business to Apollo Endosurgery, Inc., for a cash payment of $75 million and a $15 million minority equity interest in Apollo Endosurgery.

On October 21, 2013, the firm acquired Warner Chilcott.

In November 2014, Actavis announced its intention to acquire Allergan, Inc., the manufacturer of Botox Completion of the deal would increase its market capitalization to $147 billion. On March 17, 2015, Actavis completed the acquisition of Allergan, Inc. in a cash and equity transaction valued at approximately $70.5 billion, and the latter was folded into Actavis. The combination created a $23 billion diversified global pharmaceutical company with commercial reach across 100 countries. In June 2015, Actavis officially changed its name to Allergan, plc.

In June, Allergan, Inc. announced it would acquire Kythera Biopharmaceuticals for around $2.1 billion.

=== Attempted acquisition by Valeant Pharmaceuticals ===
On April 22, 2014, details were released by Valeant Pharmaceuticals and hedge fund CEO, Bill Ackman, about a $46 billion (CAD) offer presented to Allergan. Valeant proposed to exchange $48.30 in cash and 0.83 shares of Valeant per Allergan share. Allergan, Inc. stockholders would own 43 per cent of the combined company. This bid was rejected by Allergan as being too risky, claiming Valeant's business model of serial acquisitions and low organic growth being unsustainable. Soon after Valeant released a statement saying a new offer will be presented May 28, 2014, where it emerged that Valeant had increased their offer to $49.4 billion. On May 31 the offer was revised and increased to $53.3 billion.

On June 18, Valeant began its tender offer for a hostile takeover of Allergan. On August 27, 2014, Valeant and Pershing Square Capital Management asked a Chancery Judge to set a trial for September 24, 2014 to decide on whether Valeant and Pershing had properly secured enough support from Allergan shareholders to force a meeting of investors to consider replacing a majority of the company's directors. On the same day Allergan announced that they had set a December shareholder vote to decide whether the company should replace part of the board of directors. In the afternoon of August 27, Bloomberg reported that Valeant and Pershing Square had won their case with the Chancery Judge setting an October 6 date for the aforementioned trial. On November 17, 2014, Actavis, plc announced it would acquire Allergan in a white knight bid for approximately $66 billion, putting an end to Valeant's hostile takeover attempt.

== Company Structure ==
- Allergan, Inc. (Acq 2015 by Actavis, plc)
  - Kythera Biopharmaceuticals
    (Acq 2015)
  - - MAP Pharmaceuticals Inc
      (Acq 2013)
    - - Inamed Corporation
        (Acq 2006)
      - - Advanced Medical Optics
          (Spun off in 2006)

== Safety reports ==
In 2011, FDA reported issues in the investigation of safety of silicone gel-filled breast implants. However, the company announced later the reassurance to patients of the safety and exclusion of its drugs from the investigated breast implant devices, stating that all of its products are above safety standards around the world.
