= Hans Lowey =

Austrian-born American chemist (1907–1993)

Hans Lowey (1907–1993) was an Austrian-born American chemist who was a key figure in the development of sustained release medication.

Lowey was born in Vienna, the then-capital of the Austro-Hungarian Empire. He was born Jewish, so he was sent on a train to a concentration camp in 1939. However, he was helped to escape and then made his way to the United States of America.

He took over the Acme Tablet Company and later founded Forest Laboratories. In the 1950s, he developed a way to make salt tablets easily digestible by slowing their digestion to a period of 12 hours. In 1987, he developed a method to extend the digestion of medicine beyond 12 hours.
