= Aptalis =

Former American pharmaceutical firm

Aptalis Pharma Inc.
- Industry: Pharmaceutical industry
- Founded: 2011; 15 years ago
- Defunct: 2014; 12 years ago
- Fate: Acquired by Forest Laboratories
- Headquarters: Bridgewater, New Jersey
- Key people: John J. Fraher (CEO and president)

Aptalis Pharma Inc. was a company in the pharmaceutical industry. In January 2014, the company was acquired by Forest Laboratories (acquired by Allergan) for $675 million. Through a series of acquisitions, the company is now a contract development and manufacturing organization and rebranded as Adare Pharma Solutions, headquartered in Lawrenceville, New Jersey.

== History ==
=== Merger of predecessor companies: Axcan and Eurand ===
Axcan specialized in the treatment of gastrointestinal disorders. Formerly traded publicly on NASDAQ, Axcan was acquired by TPG Capital in 2008. Eurand Pharmaceuticals was a producer and contract manufacturer of sustained release dosage forms or taste-masked pharmaceutical dosage forms. Both Axcan and Eurand produced and marketed versions of the drug pancrelipase, which is used in the treatment of symptoms related to cystic fibrosis.

In 2011, Eurand Pharmaceuticals and Axcan Pharma merged to form Aptalis.

=== Product launches ===
In June 2011, the company received approval from the Food and Drug Administration to sell a low strength version of ZENPEP (pancrelipase) capsules formulated for infants with exocrine pancreatic insufficiency due to cystic fibrosis.

On January 9, 2012, the company announced an agreement to market RECTIV, an ointment for the treatment of anal fissure, in the United States.

On January 18, 2012, the company announced that its partner, Gilead Sciences, received approval for the oral powder formulation of Viread (tenofovir disoproxil).

On September 3, 2013, the company launched PYLERA capsules (Bismuth subcitrate/metronidazole/tetracycline), which, in combination with omeprazole, is indicated for the treatment of patients with helicobacter pylori infections.

=== Acquisition of the company by Forest Laboratories ===
In January 2014, Forest Laboratories (now part of Allergan) announced that it had agreed to acquire Aptalis for $2.9 billion in cash.

Aptalis withdrew its planned initial public offering after the announcement.

In April 2015, TPG Capital acquired Aptalis Pharmaceutical Technologies and the company was renamed Adare Pharmaceuticals.

In September, 2020, Thomas Lee Partners and Frazier Healthcare acquired Adare Pharmaceuticals and turned into a contract development and manufacturing organization.
