= Alliance for the Arts =

Organization based in New York City

The Alliance for the Arts was a New York City organization that served the cultural community through research and advocacy. The alliance published information on the art and cultural events in New York City as well as studies highlighting the importance of the arts to the economy and to education.

In November 2008, The Alliance for the Arts relaunched the NYC Arts Network and the Arts Research Center, a research database for quantitative information on arts and culture in New York City.

In 2010, WNET and the Municipal Art Society absorbed the work of Alliance for the Arts.

== Initiatives ==
- NYC ARTS was an online directory of Arts venues in the New York City area where profiles were provided by the organizations themselves. Its spiritual successor which uses the exact same model is Bloomberg Connects. Thirteen WNET (PBS in NY/NJ) absorbed the NYC-ARTS guide which became a full-featured television news program which ran until 2024.
- NYS ARTS was the New York State-wide version.
- NYCkidsARTS
