= Durata Therapeutics =

Pharmaceutical company

Durata Therapeutics, Inc.
- Industry: Pharmaceutical industry
- Founded: 2009; 17 years ago
- Defunct: November 17, 2014; 11 years ago
- Fate: Acquired by Actavis (now Allergan)
- Headquarters: Morristown, New Jersey

Durata Therapeutics was a clinical development stage company in the pharmaceutical industry which focused on the treatment of infections. On November 17, 2014, the company was acquired by Actavis (now Allergan) for $675 million.

== History ==
On December 21, 2009, the company acquired Vicuron Pharmaceuticals and its drug candidate, dalbavancin, a long-acting semisynthetic lipoglycopeptide antibiotic, from Pfizer and commenced operations.

On April 19, 2011, the company initiated Phase III studies of dalbavancin for intravenous (IV) treatment of acute bacterial skin and skin structure infections.

In 2012, the company moved its global headquarters from Morristown to Chicago and received $2 million in tax credits.
