= Allen Chao =

Taiwanese-American Businessman

- 趙宇天
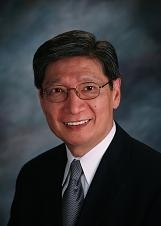
- Born: 1944 (age 81–82); Shanghai, China
- Education: Taipei Medical University (BS); West Virginia University (MS); Purdue University (PhD)
- Occupation: Founder of Watson Pharmaceuticals

Allen Y. Chao (born 1944) is a Taiwanese-American businessman who founded Watson Pharmaceuticals and was chief executive officer from 1984 to 2008, and chairman.

== Life and career ==
Born in Shanghai, he spent his childhood in Taiwan. Chao went to Taipei Medical College, where he graduated with a B.S. degree in pharmacy in 1967. After emigrating to the United States, Chao obtained an M.S. degree in Pharmaceutics from West Virginia University in 1970. He subsequently received a Ph.D. degree in Industrial and Physical Pharmacy from Purdue University in 1973. Chao, along with other members of the Chao family, contributed to the establishment of the Chao Family Comprehensive Cancer Center and the H.H. Chao Comprehensive Digestive Disease Center at the University of California, Irvine Medical Center, Irvine, California campus. Since their first gift to the university in 1995, Chao and his family have given nearly $30 million to the campus.

In 2005, Chao contributed to the establishment of The Chao Center for Industrial Pharmacy, located in the Purdue Research Park in Indiana, to provide leadership in pharmaceutical education, development and manufacturing. He is chairman and managing partner of Newport Healthcare Advisors LLC. He is also a trustee of the University of California, Irvine Foundation.

In May 2000, Chao received an honorary doctorate from Purdue University.
