= Bonnie S. Dunbar =

American zoologist (born 1948)

Bonnie Dunbar
- Born: Bonita Sue Dunbar; February 14, 1948 (age 78); Sterling, Colorado
- Education: University of Colorado Boulder, University of Tennessee Knoxville
- Awards: Best Paper and Presentation, 1973 Southwest Developmental Biology Symposium; honored as First Margaret Pittman Lecturer in 1994
- Scientific career
- Fields: Zoology
- Workplaces: Baylor College of Medicine
- Thesis: Characterization of macromolecular components of rabbit uterine secretions (1977)

Bonita Sue Dunbar (born February 14, 1948), known as Bonnie Dunbar or Bonnie S. Dunbar, is an American zoologist and academic who was a professor in the department of molecular and cell biology at Baylor College of Medicine from 1994 to 2004, having been an assistant professor there from 1981 to 1983. From 1984 to 1994, also at Baylor College of Medicine, she also held a position as associate professor in the department of obstetrics and gynecology.

She is an honorary lecturer at the University of Nairobi. She is a member of the American Association for the Advancement of Science, the Endocrine Society, the American Society for Cell Biology, and the New York Academy of Sciences. She is the owner of the Karen Blixen Coffee Garden Restaurant and Cottages, as well as the treasurer of the African Biomedical Center. She was on the editorial board of the journal Medical Veritas, which was published from 2004 to 2008 and endorsed anti-vaccine views.

== Education ==
Dunbar was born in Sterling, Colorado. She received her bachelors' (1970) and masters' (1971) degrees from the University of Colorado Boulder, followed by a PhD in zoology from the University of Tennessee in 1977. She did postdoctoral research from 1975 to 1978 at the University of California Davis.

== Scientific career ==
After completing her postdoc, Dunbar worked at the Population Council of Rockefeller University until 1981, when she became an assistant professor at Baylor College of Medicine's department of cell biology. Her research into the zona pellucida as a graduate student led her to the search for a contraceptive when she noticed that some infertile women had antibodies to their own zona pellucida, preventing the sperm from entering the egg when sex took place. To this end, she proposed the injection of pig proteins into rabbits to induce autoimmunity, a proposal which proved successful; however, it was not without serious side effects: the rabbits thus immunized developed an autoimmune disease which resulted in their immune system attacking their ovaries, causing permanent ovarian failure.

She said that her interest in this arose because "...in my young years I had a vision that maybe we could help the world population problem and provide women with an option for birth control that was not invasive in our hormones or our systems or otherwise have the side effects we now see with a lot of contraceptive methods." In February 1991, Dr. Dunbar received a patent on such a vaccine while affiliated with Zonagen. In 1994, Dunbar filed a lawsuit accusing Baylor College of Medicine, the Houston-based law firm Fulbright & Jaworski, Zonagen, and a group of investors of forcing her to relinquish patent rights to this vaccine. In 1999, the parties reached a settlement; the terms were not disclosed, but Dunbar said she was "very happy" with it. In June 2001, Dunbar lost everything she had been storing in her lab—"20 years of research" according to the Houston Chronicle—after Tropical Storm Allison devastated Baylor College of Medicine.

== Views on the Hepatitis B vaccine ==
Dunbar has vocally criticized the hepatitis B vaccine, which, she claims, may be more dangerous than Hepatitis B itself for a small portion of the Caucasian population. She began suspecting the vaccine was dangerous after her brother, Bohn, developed rashes on his face, fatigue, and a number of other symptoms after being vaccinated with it. In 2000, Dunbar said that her brother "hasn't been out of bed since" he received the Hepatitis B vaccine.

A 2004 study showed an association between recombinant Hepatitis B vaccine and multiple sclerosis, but the current status of research is "inconclusive".
