= John Lowey =

John Lowey may refer to:

- John Lowey (boxer) (born 1966), Northern Irish boxer
- John Lowey (footballer) (1958–2019), English footballer
