= Repros Therapeutics =

Defunct American biopharmaceutical company

- Formerly: Zonagen
- Type: Subsidiary
- Traded as: Formerly Nasdaq: RPRX
- Industry: Pharmaceutical industry
- Founded: 1987; 39 years ago
- Founder: Bonnie S. Dunbar, Baylor College of Medicine and a group of investors
- Defunct: 2017
- Fate: Acquired after a number of failed drugs
- Successor: Allergan
- Headquarters: The Woodlands, Texas, United States
- Key people: Joseph S. Podolski (CEO)
- Products: Trailed drugs for contraception, endomitosis and other pharmaceuticals
- Parent: Allergan
- Website: www.reprosrx.com

Repros Therapeutics Inc. was a US-based development stage biopharmaceutical company headquartered in The Woodlands, Texas. Founded in 1987 as Zonagen, it focused on the development of oral small molecule drugs to address major unmet medical needs in male and female health. Joseph S. Podolski was the CEO of this company. The company attempted to develop a vaccine based contraceptive, but trails failed and project was later abandoned.

== History ==
The company was organized on August 28, 1987, as Zonagen, to try to develop birth control methods based on modification of the zona pellucida—a part of the oocyte. The company bought the rights to the research of Bonnie S. Dunbar, researcher and professor at the Baylor College of Medicine, and attempted to create a contraceptive vaccine.

Zonagen, Inc. was formed in 1987 by Dunbar, Baylor and a group of investors, including Ross Perot and Lloyd Bentsen III, son of 69th United States Secretary of Treasury Lloyd Bentsen. The company hoped to market Dunbar's invention as a nonsurgical method of sterilizing dogs and cats. In the meantime, Zonagen would help Dunbar continue the pursuit of her life's work: the world's first contraceptive vaccine for humans.

Her research, which had been progressing well, ground to a complete halt according to Brian Wallstin of the Houston Press newspaper in his article “Biological Disaster.” The company, went public in 1993 with claims that a contraceptive vaccine was imminent. Bonnie Dunbar ended relations with the company and sued them. Zonagen would not develop any commercial product from research relating to the zona pellucida—despite naming itself after it.

Its next project was to create an adjuvant. These products modify the effects of the active ingredient in a drug without having any direct effects of their own. However, Zonagen's attempt, ImmuMax, was merely an attempt to patent and cash in off a widely researched generic product: a structural element in the exoskeleton of crustaceans. The compound, chitosan, was indeed capable of causing some desirable effects within the immune system, but it also caused permanent scarring at injection point, which made it useless for the sort of medicinal purposes Zonagen hoped to use it for.

After ceasing work on ImmuMax, Zonagen moved on to its third drug Vasomax, a disintegrating oral formulation of phentolamine. Realizing that Pfizer's Viagra was going to be a hit product, Zonagen attempted to create a competing erectile dysfunction drug of its own. However, unlike Pfizer, Zonagen repeated its experience from ImmuMax; it got a forty-year-old generic drug, phentolamine, and attempted to use it as was a genuine Viagra competitor. While phentolamine was never proven to create erections by itself, Zonagen claimed that its formulation, simply phentolamine administered orally instead of in pill form, would work. Despite a failed Phase II trial in 1996 for Vasomax, the company proceeded to Phase III trials anyway. Once Schering-Plough pulled out of its partnership with Zonagen for Vasomax, Zonagen abandoned its New Drug Application for Vasomax. The company was left with little more than a corporate shell and a bunch of lawsuits.

Joseph S. Podolski was chief executive officer since 1992. He joined Zonagen in 1989 as Vice President of Operations. Previously, Podolski spent twelve years in various engineering, product development and manufacturing positions at G.D. Searle, a subsidiary of Monsanto Company. Before joining Monsanto, Podolski held positions in manufacturing, engineering, quality control and development of fine chemicals, antibiotics, pharmaceuticals and hospital products with Abbott Laboratories, Dearborn Chemical Company and Baxter Pharmaceuticals. Podolski, the man who led Zonagen through two decades, decided it was time for a name change. In 2006, Zonagen changed its name to Repros Therapeutics, started to develop other pharmaceutical products for the reproductive system, and began work on its fourth lead drug, Proellex. Proellex is a very similar drug to asoprisnil. Asoprisnil was developed by Germany-based Schering AG to treat endometriosis. Development was discontinued because the drug was causing thickening of the endometrium. Repros claimed that its time on the drug/off the drug approach will make a big difference in safety versus asoprisnil. Currently, products under clinical trial are Proellex and Androxal. None have been approved by the Food and Drug Administration as of mid-2010. Androxal consists of an isomer of Clomifene, which is already being used as a generic treatment for male hypogonadism.

In December 2017, Allergan announced it was buying Repros Therapeutics. Repros now operates as a subsidiary of Allergan. Allergan was later acquired by Abbvie.
