= Warner Chilcott =

American pharmaceutical company

Warner Chilcott plc
- Industry: Pharmaceutical industry
- Founded: 1968; 58 years ago
- Founder: Allen McClay
- Defunct: October 1, 2013; 12 years ago
- Fate: Acquired by Actavis (now Allergan)
- Headquarters: Rockaway, New Jersey

Warner Chilcott (formerly Galen) was a company in the pharmaceutical industry based in Rockaway, New Jersey. It was primarily focused on women's healthcare and dermatology. On October 1, 2013, the company was acquired by Actavis (now Allergan).

== History ==
=== Predecessor companies ===
==== Galen ====
In 1968, Sir Allen McClay founded Galen, a sales and marketing organization focused on branded pharmaceutical products in the United Kingdom and the Republic of Ireland.

In 1997, the company listed its shares on the London Stock Exchange and the Irish Stock Exchange.

==== Warner Chilcott ====
Warner Chilcott was the generic drug business of Warner–Lambert.

The company Warner-Chilcott published at least one pocket book, 1000 Calories: Your Diet Program, in 1966, in Morris Plains, New Jersey.

In 1996, it was sold to Nale Laboratories P.L.C.

In 2004, the company was acquired by several private equity firms. In 2006, it became a public company via an initial public offering.

=== Merger of Galen and Warner Chilcott ===
In 2000, Galen acquired Warner Chilcott and listed its American depositary receipts on NASDAQ.

In 2004, the company changed its name from Galen to Warner Chilcott.

=== Post-merger ===
In August 2004, the company prevailed in a patent case by Teva Pharmaceutical Industries related to Sarafem (Fluoxetine). On May 19, 2006, the company received approval from the Food and Drug Administration for Sarafem.

On October 30, 2009, the company acquired the prescription drug business of Procter & Gamble for $3.1 billion.

On October 1, 2013, the company was acquired by Actavis (now Allergan).
