= Evident Change =

- Formation: 1907; 119 years ago
- Type: Nonprofit
- Purpose: Social research
- Region served: United States
- Website: web

Evident Change, formerly the National Council on Crime and Delinquency (NCCD), is an American nonprofit research organization. NCCD was organized by fourteen probation officers who met at Plymouth Church in Minneapolis, Minnesota, on June 17, 1907, to establish a volunteer professional organization in the emerging field of probation. The group adopted by-laws in 1909, and committees began doing year-round volunteer work. They named themselves the National Probation Association (NPA). Within their first decade, they were active in pursuit of progressive system reforms. The NPA’s focus was to study, establish, expand, and standardize juvenile probation, juvenile courts, and family courts. Charles Chute became the first paid executive of the NPA in 1921. In 1947 the NPA merged with the American Parole Association to form the National Probation and Parole Association (NPPA). In 1960, the organization’s name was changed to the National Council on Crime and Delinquency (NCCD) to reflect its growth and larger public policy interests. During the Nixon Administration, NCCD challenged existing policies and critiqued the criminal justice system. Part of the Board of Directors wanted to focus on generic support of prevention efforts; NCCD subsequently parted company with several board members who created an independent crime prevention council, Citizens for Justice with Order. In 1993, the Children’s Research Center was created as part of NCCD to encompass reform of the child welfare system.

NCCD changed its name to Evident Change in December 2020.

== Locations ==
Currently, NCCD has offices in Oakland, California, and Madison, Wisconsin.
