= Forest Laboratories =

Former pharmaceutical company merged with Allergan

Forest Laboratories, Inc.
- Industry: Pharmaceutical industry
- Founded: 1956
- Defunct: July 1, 2014; 11 years ago
- Headquarters: New York City
- Key people: Brenton L. Saunders (CEO)
- Revenue: ▲$3.646 billion (2013)
- Net income: ▲$165 million (2013)
- Total assets: ▲$12.017 billion (2013)
- Total equity: ▲$6.165 billion (2013)
- Number of employees: 6,200 (2013)

Forest Laboratories was a company in the pharmaceutical industry incorporated in Delaware, with its principal office in New York City. It was known for licensing European pharmaceuticals for sale in the United States. On July 1, 2014, the company was acquired by Actavis (now Allergan).

== History ==
The company was founded by Hans Lowey in 1956 as a small laboratory service company.

In 1967, the company became a public company via an initial public offering.

Ten years later, Howard Solomon became the chief executive officer of the company.

In 1984, the company acquired O'Neal Jones & Feldman for $8.8 million after a federal investigation resulted in one of its drugs being recalled.

On July 17, 1998, the company received approval from the Food and Drug Administration for Celexa (Citalopram), an antidepressant.

In 2000, the company cut ties with Warner-Lambert for the marketing of Celexa after Warner-Lambert was acquired by Pfizer.

On August 16, 2002, the company received approval from the Food and Drug Administration for Lexapro (Escitalopram), an updated version of Celexa.

In 2013, Solomon retired as chief executive officer of the company.

In February 2014, the company acquired Aptalis for $2.9 billion.

On July 1, 2014, the company was acquired by Actavis (now Allergan). The sale of the company came after pressure from Carl Icahn, the largest shareholder.

== Products ==
Some of the products Forest Laboratories marketed with its partners included:

- AeroBid (flunisolide inhaler) for allergic rhinitis
- Armour Thyroid (desiccated thyroid extract tablets) for hypothyroidism and pituitary Thyroid-stimulating hormone suppression
- Bystolic (nebivolol) for hypertension
- Campral (acamprosate) for maintenance of abstinence from alcohol in patients with alcohol dependence
- Celexa (citalopram) for depression (developed by Lundbeck)
- Cervidil (dinoprostone vaginal insert) for the initiation and/or continuation of cervical ripening in certain patients
- Combunox (oxycodone/ibuprofen) for the short-term management of acute moderate-to-severe pain
- Daliresp (roflumilast) for reduction of COPD exacerbations in patients with severe COPD
- Fetzima (levomilnacipran extended release) for depression
- Lexapro (escitalopram) for depression and generalized anxiety disorder (developed in cooperation with Lundbeck)
- Levothroid (levothyroxine) for hypothyroidism and pituitary TSH suppression
- Linzess (linaclotide) for constipation-predominant irritable bowel syndrome and functional constipation
- Monurol (fosfomycin) for certain urinary tract infections
- Namenda and Namenda XR (memantine) for moderate-to-severe Alzheimer's disease
- Savella (milnacipran) for fibromyalgia
- Sudocrem medicated cream for irritant diaper dermatitis
- Teflaro (ceftaroline fosamil) for acute bacterial skin and skin structure infections and community-acquired pneumonia caused by susceptible bacteria
- Tiazac (diltiazem hydrochloride) for hypertension and chronic stable angina pectoris
- Thyrolar (liotrix) for hypothyroidism and pituitary TSH suppression
- Tudorza Pressair (aclidinium bromide inhalation powder) for COPD
- Viibryd (vilazodone) for depression

== Controversies ==
=== Illegal distribution and promotion of medicines ===
In September 2010, the company agreed to pay $313 million to resolve allegations of civil and criminal liability relating to felony, obstruction of justice, and the illegal distribution and promotion of pharmaceuticals, charges to which it pled guilty. One of the pharmaceutical-related charges was a misdemeanor charge of illegally promoting the Celexa and Lexapro for unapproved uses in treating pediatric depression. The other drug-related charge was a misdemeanor charge of distributing the unapproved drug Levothroid in violation of the Federal Food, Drug, and Cosmetic Act. Certain of the criminal activities were revealed with the help of whistleblowers, who received $14 million from the settlement.

Forest Laboratories has been accused of using unlawful deals to prevent generic versions of its Alzheimer's disease drug Namenda from entering the market.

=== Tax avoidance via transfer pricing ===
In 2010, the company was criticized for legally moving its profits offshore via transfer pricing.
