= Cmin =

Minimum blood plasma concentration of a drug during the time between two doses

C_{min} is a term used in pharmacokinetics for the minimum blood plasma concentration reached by a drug during a dosing interval, which is the time interval between administration of two doses. This definition is slightly different from C_{trough}, the concentration immediately prior to administration of the next dose. C_{min} is the opposite of C_{max}, the maximum concentration that the drug reaches. C_{min} must be above certain thresholds, such as the minimum inhibitory concentration (MIC), to achieve a therapeutic effect.

In most cases C_{min} is directly measurable. At steady state the minimum plasma concentration can also be calculated using the following equation:
$$C_{min} = \frac{SFDk_a}{V_d(k_a-k_e)} \times \left( \frac{e^{-k_e\tau}}{1-e^{-k_e\tau}}-\frac{e^{-k_a\tau}}{1-e^{-k_a\tau}} \right)$$

S = Salt factor
F = Bioavailability
D = Dose
k_{e} = Elimination rate constant
k_{a} = Absorption rate constant
V_{d} = Volume of distribution
τ = Dosing interval

C_{min} is also an important parameter in bioavailability and bioequivalence studies, it is part of the pharmacokinetic information recommended for submission of investigational new drug applications.
