= Ketamir-2 =

Clinical data
- Other names: Ketamir; Oral ketamine analogue; 1-(2-Chlorophenyl)-N-methyl-2-oxocyclopentan-1-amine
- Routes of administration: Oral
- Drug class: NMDA receptor antagonist
- ATC code: None

Identifiers
- IUPAC name: 2-(2-chlorophenyl)-2-(methylamino)cyclopentan-1-one
- PubChem CID: 172323799

Chemical and physical data
- Formula: C_{12}H_{14}ClNO
- Molar mass: 223.70 g·mol^{−1}
- 3D model (JSmol): Interactive image
- SMILES: CNC1(CCCC1=O)C2=CC=CC=C2Cl
- InChI: InChI=1S/C12H14ClNO/c1-14-12(8-4-7-11(12)15)9-5-2-3-6-10(9)13/h2-3,5-6,14H,4,7-8H2,1H3; Key:DEJMAUCINACUGY-UHFFFAOYSA-N

Ketamir-2, or simply Ketamir, also known as oral ketamine analogue or as 1-(2-chlorophenyl)-N-methyl-2-oxocyclopentan-1-amine, is an NMDA receptor antagonist closely related ketamine and other arylcyclohexylamines which is under development for the treatment of depressive disorders and other conditions such as neuropathic pain. It is the analogue of ketamine in which the 6-membered cyclohexane ring has been replaced with a 5-membered cyclopentane ring. Ketamir-2 is orally active.

== Pharmacology ==
Ketamir-2 is a very low-affinity antagonist of the phencyclidine (PCP) site of the NMDA receptor. Its affinity (IC_{50}) for the PCP site of the NMDA receptor is approximately 100 μM, whereas that of ketamine (K_{i}) has been found to be about 660 nM (which is ~150-fold higher affinity). Ketamir-2 also has a major active metabolite, desmethylketamir (norketamir), which has an affinity (IC_{50}) for the PCP site of the NMDA receptor of about 470 μM. Ketamir-2 showed no activity at other sites besides the PCP site of the NMDA receptor when screened against a panel of 40 receptors, transporters, enzymes, and ion channels. This is in contrast to ketamine, which shows appreciable affinities for a variety of other targets. As such, Ketamir-2 is claimed to be more selective than ketamine.

Whereas ketamine is a substrate for P-glycoprotein and this might impede its absorption and distribution, Ketamir-2 does not bind to this protein. Relatedly, Ketamir-2 shows improved oral bioavailability relative to ketamine and might have better blood–brain barrier permeability. Ketamir-2 displays a pharmacokinetic profile in animals of rapid absorption and short elimination half-life. Whereas ketamine produces hyperlocomotion in rodents, a stimulant- and putatively psychotic-like effect, Ketamir-2, depending on the dose, either did not affect locomotor activity or decreased it. Ketamir-2 showed antidepressant-like, anxiolytic-like, and analgesic-like effects in animal models.

== History ==
Ketamir-2 is under development by MIRA Pharmaceuticals. As of July 2024, it is in the preclinical research stage of development. In June 2025, the first journal article about Ketamir-2 was published. According to the Drug Enforcement Administration (DEA), Ketamir-2 is not a controlled substance in the United States as of 2024.

== See also ==
- List of investigational hallucinogens and entactogens
- Arylcyclohexylamine § Related compounds
- PCPEP
