= Flip–flop kinetics =

Flip–flop kinetics, or flip–flop pharmacokinetics, describes an atypical situation in pharmacokinetics where a drug's rate of absorption or the rate at which it enters the bloodstream is slower than its elimination rate. That is, when the k_{a} (absorption constant) is slower than k_{e} (elimination constant).

These circumstances can occur with sustained-release formulations, depot injections, and some subcutaneous or intradermal injections. In the resulting slope of log plasma concentration (log Cp) versus time, the apparent k_{e} is determined by the k_{a}, and the apparent k_{e} is smaller than when the drug is administered intravenously or by immediate-release formulation. Depot injections such as depot antipsychotics and long-acting injectable steroid hormone medications like estradiol valerate, testosterone enanthate, and medroxyprogesterone acetate are examples of drugs with flip–flop kinetics.

The term "flip–flop" indicates that the downward slope more closely represents k_{a} rather than k_{e}.

Flip–flop kinetics can create difficulties in the determination and interpretation of pharmacokinetic parameters if not recognized.
