= Drug permeability =

Measure of drug take up into the body

In medicinal chemistry, Drug Permeability is an empirical parameter that indicates how quickly a chemical entity or an active pharmaceutical ingredient crosses a biological membrane or another biological barrier to become bioavailable in the body. Drug permeability, together with drug aqueous solubility, are the two parameters that define the fate of the active ingredient after oral administration and ultimately define its bioavailability. When drug permeability is empirically measured in vitro, it is generally called apparent permeability (P_{app}) as its absolute value varies according to the method selected for its measurement. P_{app} is measured in vitro utilizing cellular-based barriers such as the Caco-2 model or utilizing artificial biomimetic barriers, such as the Parallel Artificial Membrane Permeation Assay (PAMPA) or the PermeaPad. All these methods are built on an acceptor compartment (from 0.2 up to several mL according to the method used) where the drug solution is placed, a biomimetic barrier, and an acceptor compartment, where the drug concentration is quantified over time. By maintaining sink condition, a steady state is reached after a lag time (τ, Fig. 1) .

== Data Analysis ==
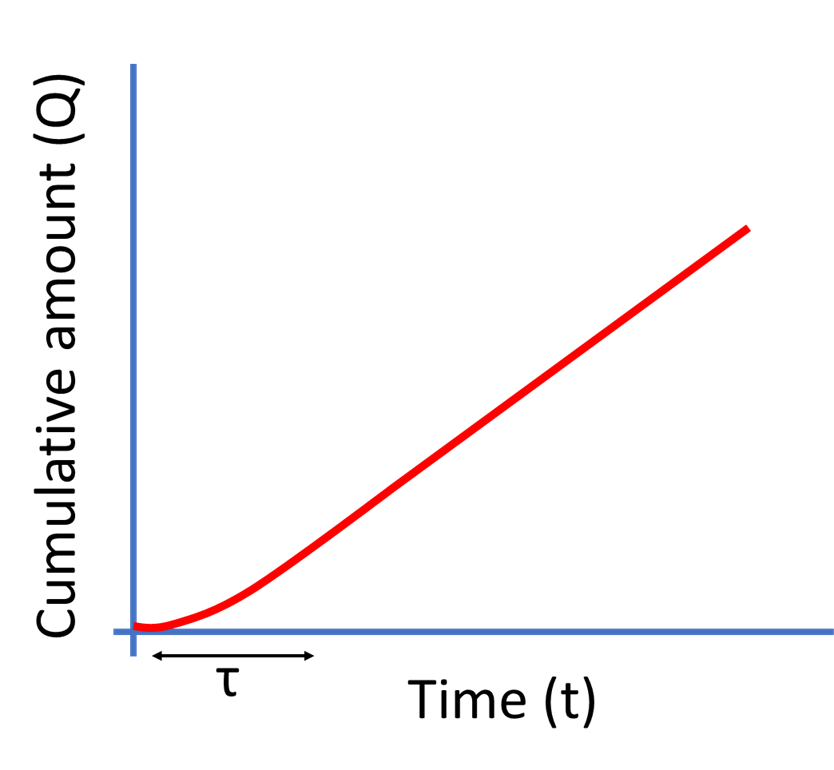
Figure 1. Drug flux diagram

The drug flux represents the slope of the linear regression of the accumulated mass (Q) over time (t) normalized over the permeation area (A), i.e., the surface area of the barrier available for permeation.

Equation 1: $j=dQ/dt*1/A$

The drug apparent permeability (P_{app}) is calculated by normalizing the drug flux (j) over the initial concentration of the API in the donor compartment (c_{0}) as:

Equation 2: $P_{app}=j/c_0$

Dimensionally, the P_{app} represents a velocity, and it is normally expressed in cm/sec. The highest is the permeability, and the highest is expected to be the bioavailability of the drug after oral administration.

== See also ==
- Lipinski's rule of five
- Pharmacodynamics
- Pharmacokinetics
