= Biopharmaceutics Classification System =

System to differentiate drugs on the basis of their solubility and permeability

The Biopharmaceutics Classification System (BCS) is a system to differentiate drugs on the basis of their solubility and permeability.

This system restricts the prediction using the parameters solubility and intestinal permeability. The solubility classification is based on a United States Pharmacopoeia (USP) aperture. The intestinal permeability classification is based on a comparison to the intravenous injection. All those factors are highly important because 85% of the most sold drugs in the United States and Europe are orally administered.

== Classes ==
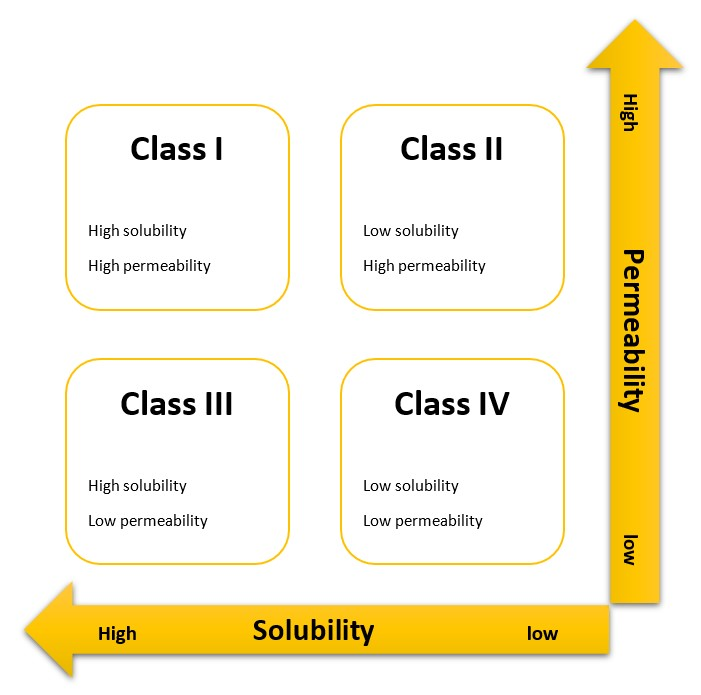
BCS classes

According to the Biopharmaceutics Classification System (BCS) drug substances are classified to four classes upon their solubility and permeability:

- Class I – high permeability, high solubility
  - Example: metoprolol, paracetamol
  - The bioavailability of those products is limited by their solvation rate. A correlation between the in vivo bioavailability and the in vitro solvation can be found.
- Class II – high permeability, low solubility
  - Example: glibenclamide, bicalutamide, ezetimibe, aceclofenac
  - Those compounds are well absorbed and their absorption rate is usually higher than excretion.
- Class III – low permeability, high solubility
  - Example: cimetidine
  - The absorption is limited by the permeation rate but the drug is solvated very fast. If the formulation does not change the permeability or gastro-intestinal duration time, then class I criteria can be applied.
- Class IV – low permeability, low solubility
  - Example: bifonazole
  - Those compounds have a poor bioavailability. Usually they are not well absorbed over the intestinal mucosa and a high variability is expected.

== Definitions ==
The drugs are classified in BCS on the basis of solubility and permeability.

Solubility class boundaries are based on the highest dose strength of an immediate release product. A drug is considered highly soluble when the highest dose strength is soluble in 250 ml or less of aqueous media over the pH range of 1 to 6.8. The volume estimate of 250 ml is derived from typical bioequivalence study protocols that prescribe administration of a drug product to fasting human volunteers with a glass of water.

Permeability class boundaries are based indirectly on the extent of absorption of a drug substance in humans and directly on the measurement of rates of mass transfer across human intestinal membrane. Alternatively non-human systems capable of predicting drug absorption in humans can be used (such as in-vitro culture methods). A drug substance is considered highly permeable when the extent of absorption in humans is determined to be 85% or more of the administered dose based on a mass-balance determination or in comparison to an intravenous dose.

== See also ==
- ADME
  - Partition coefficient
  - Bioavailability
  - Drug metabolism
  - First pass effect
- Polar surface area
- IVIVC
