= Balanced anesthesia =

Anesthetic technique

Balanced anesthesia, also known as multimodal anesthesia (also spelt: anaesthesia), is a technique used to induce and maintain anesthesia in patients undergoing surgery or certain medical procedures. This method employs a combination of anesthetic agents and other drugs – and techniques – to selectively target various aspects of the central nervous system, allowing for a tailored anesthetic experience based on the individual patient's needs and the specific requirements of the procedure.

The specialist physician (in Canadian and American English: anesthesiologist; in Commonwealth and British English: anaesthetist) or veterinarian evaluates various patient factors prior to selecting an anesthetic approach. These factors include major organ function, general condition, and compensatory capacity (ability to function despite stressors). In balanced anesthesia, appropriate agents are used in combination, at carefully-calibrated levels.

The concept of balanced anesthesia was first introduced by John Silas Lundy in 1926 and has since become the predominant method of anesthesia in modern medical practice.

== Rationale ==
The primary objectives of general anesthesia include inducing unconsciousness, providing analgesia, facilitating muscle relaxation, and the temporary suppression of motor reflexes. Achieving muscle paralysis is often necessary for certain surgical procedures. Depending on the procedure to be undertaken, blocking transmission of nociception (autonomic nervous system responses to noxious stimuli and its cardiac and hemodynamic effects – even in the absence of conscious pain perception), may be the aim of analgesia. Amnesia – induced through an altered state of consciousness – may be adequate or preferred over total unconsciousness. The physiological stability of the patient has to be maintained while all this is achieved.

Balanced anesthesia is employed in a range of surgical procedures to optimize patient safety and comfort. It is commonly used in major abdominal surgeries, such as bowel resections, liver surgery, and gastric bypass, where deep anesthesia and muscle relaxation are required. In cardiac surgery, balanced anesthesia facilitates precise control of heart rate and blood pressure, which is critical during these complex procedures. Additionally, orthopedic surgeries, including hip and knee replacements, utilize this approach to enhance muscle relaxation and pain management. Gynecological surgeries, such as hysterectomies and laparoscopic procedures, also benefit from balanced anesthesia to maintain patient stability and comfort throughout the operation.

== Pharmacokinetic factors ==
The scope of pharmacodynamics is the effects caused on the body by a medicine. The distribution of any pharmacologic agent, its concentration in tissues, blood or plasma, and its clearance from the body, are the pharmacokinetic features of a medicine.

Unlike single-agent anesthesia, which can lead to increased adverse effects when higher doses of a single drug are administered, balanced anesthesia allows for the use of lower doses of multiple agents. This strategy minimizes the risk of side effects by enabling the anesthesiologist to target specific effects through the adjustment of individual agents. The pharmacodynamics of each agent—their effects on the body—can be finely controlled, while pharmacokinetics—how these agents are distributed and cleared from the body—plays a critical role in the effectiveness of the anesthesia.

Injectable anesthetic agents may be administered by constant rate infusion (CRI) which is a portion of balanced anesthetic techniques, can be made like a single intermittent dose or as a single injection. It should keep a during the time. Both the foreseeable pharmacodynamic effects and foreseeable concentration of plasma can be offered by the CRI of specific medicine. It has similarity on keeping the invariable concentration of end-tidal by using the vaporous precise device, which can provide the volatile anesthetic.

When the administration rate exceeds the clearance rate, a stable-state concentration has been achieved by delivering the medicine as a CRI. In addition, if the medicine has distributed fully at equilibrium in the body, which is called the volume of distribution at a stable state. In case the loading dose was administered after the CRI, the time period of which will keep the concentration at a stable state equals 3 time constants or 5 terminal half-lives of the specific medicine. The bolus dose can full with the volume of the medicine in an efficient and effective way so that the medicine can be cleared and delivered. This also can promote to achieve the stable state in a prompter approach.

Administering a CRI has two important methods: targeting a specific infusion rate, and making the infusion rate constant.

- Make the infusion rate constant
Maintaining a stable infusion rate involves ensuring that a steady-state concentration is achieved through proper distribution of the anesthetic agent. However, if tissue saturation occurs while the infusion rate remains constant, there is a risk that the infusion may exceed the drug's clearance rate, leading to plasma concentrations that exceed anticipated levels. Consequently, it is essential to periodically adjust the continuous rate infusion (CRI) to ensure effective and safe management of anesthesia over time.
- Target a specific infusion rate
Targeting a specific infusion rate involves adjusting the delivery of the anesthetic agent based on specific pharmacokinetic rate constants. These constants govern the distribution of the drug within bodily compartments, which is influenced by the saturation levels of the tissues, as determined by prior pharmacokinetic studies involving specific populations. Implementing a target-controlled infusion system, which includes a computer program and a syringe pump, requires a thorough understanding of these pharmacokinetic parameters.

== Veterinary use ==
Based on a 2010 review of injectable-agent use for short-duration anesthesia, the American Association of Equine Practitioners recommends the use of xylazine as a sedative for induction of anesthesia for durations of around 20 minutes or less. In addition, diazepam and ketamine are recommended after the xylazine. For longer duration anesthesia, those over 30 minutes, the most common anesthetics is the combination of guaifenesin, ketamine, and xylazine or isoflurane.

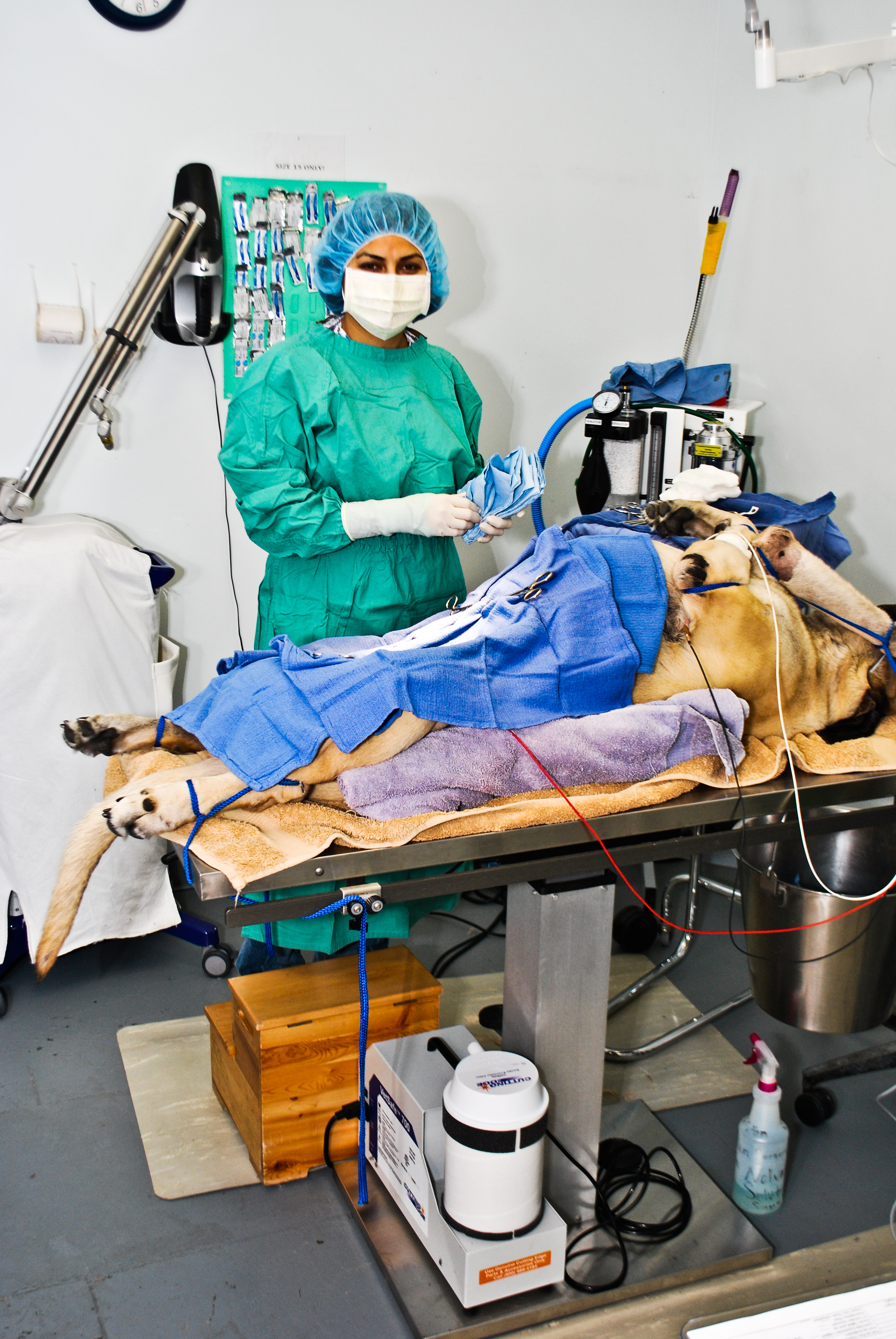
Dog anesthesia

The technique of balanced anesthetic has been applied widely with cats and dogs.

When general anesthesia is used for cats and dogs, the most common method is inhalant agents because they are both easy to manage and the depth of anesthesia is predictable. The depth of anesthesia can be changed and recovered if some unexpected situation occurs during surgery. Although inhaled anesthetics will cause an unconscious state in which cats and dogs will not recall or perceive pain, the depth of anesthesia may not prevent the variety of reflex reactions to harmful stimuli during the operation. In order to prevent these reflex reactions, it may be required to increase the concentration of inhalant anesthetic agents; higher rates of inhalant administration are associated with higher cardiovascular and respiratory complications. Respiratory depression may result, especially in young patients and those with preexisting systemic disease. This is associated with increased morbidity and mortality.

With the balanced anesthetic technique, the low concentration of inhalant anesthetic agents and other medicines used during the operation can alter the perception of painful stimuli. In other words, using balanced anesthetic techniques for cats and dogs can decrease the morbidity and mortality effectively. Therefore, in this situation, using balanced anesthetic techniques in cats and dogs is less risky for operation than using the general anesthesia. According to a report from a teaching hospital, the rate of complications resulting in death in cats and dogs using the balanced anesthesia are relatively low, at 1/9 and 1/233 respectively.

=== Advantages in animals ===
Balanced anesthesia has various advantages in veterinary cases: In certain circumstances it is considerably cheaper than the usual anesthesia. Secondly, it can reduce the death rate. Furthermore, it offers more stable operating conditions for veterinarians. It also increase animal safety and comfort. Balanced anesthesia can make patients calm by using drugs such as: medetomidine, diazepam or midazolam, and acepromazine. Keeping patients calm prior to surgery can avoid the unpredictable consequences of stress, such as tachypnea, hypertension and tachycardia which may be harmful to the anesthetized patients. In addition, anxiety and stress may cause the nociceptive pain. The balanced anesthesia therefore may therefore decrease those possible complications.

Another advantage of using balanced anesthesia is that it can decrease the chance of adverse effects. All medicines may have adverse effect on patients; some serious adverse effects of anesthesia may be caused by inhalational anesthetic, although in general these medicines are highly safe and useful. Using the correct amount of balanced anesthetic agents, the adverse effects can be reduced to some extent.

Balanced anesthesia can also minimize the pain patients suffer. Pain may delay wound healing, decrease appetite, and even result in death. Using the proper amount of analgesics can reduce the amount of inhalant anesthetics required and help patients reduce the pain.

=== Commonly-used agents for animals ===
The quantity of a single anesthetic which is used for balanced techniques has similarity with that which is used for standing sedation. However, compare to the doses used for TIVA (total intravenous anesthesia), which is always lower than using the single anesthetics. The doses of anesthetics required differ, and depend on the required duration of anesthesia, the requirements for anesthesia to volatile, expected pain of injection of anesthesia, the experience the anesthetist using various medicines, and other factors.

The pharmacokinetics of the two most common anesthetic agents, xylazine and ketamine, used during the surgical anasthesia are:

==== Xylazine pharmacokinetics ====
Xylazine

Xylazine is the most widely anesthetic agent used for short-duration operations in non-human animals. It does not have a medical use in humans.

Pharmacokinetics of xylazine may be influenced by anesthesia since after an intravenous therapy about 1.1 mg/kg, the half-life of xylazine will increase to 118 minutes and the clearance will decrease to 6 mL/kg/min. Based on a recent study, if injecting the morphine, which is 0.1 or 0.2 mg/kg, in the vein at the same time can extend the terminal half-life to about 150 minutes and the clearance will not be influenced.

==== Ketamine pharmacokinetics ====
Ketamine

Ketamine is the most widely anesthetic agent used for longer duration operations.

After an intravenous therapy, which is about 2.2 mg/kg, mixed with the 1.1 mg/kg xylazine the half-life of xylazine is approximately 66 minutes and the clearance is around 31 mL/kg/min when patients are halothane-anesthetized. If only managing the xylazine and ketamine, the terminal half-life will be 42 minutes and its clearance will be 27 mL/kg/min. When the CRI of ketamine is kept stable for an hour at 2.4 mg/kg/h, the terminal half-life will be 46 minutes and the clearance will be 32 mL/kg/min.

== See also ==
- American Society of Anesthesiologists
- Anesthetic technician
- Nurse anesthetist – Advanced Practice Registered Nurse with expertise in anesthesia
- Local anesthetic – Medications to reversibly block pain
- Neuromuscular-blocking drug – Type of paralyzing anesthetic including lepto- and pachycurares
