= ADME =

Acronym for process of disposition of pharmaceutical compounds

Processes in pharmacokinetics

ADME is the four-letter abbreviation (acronym) for absorption, distribution, metabolism, and excretion, and is mainly used in fields such as pharmacokinetics and pharmacology. The four letters stand for descriptors quantifying how a given drug interacts within the body over time. The term ADME was first introduced in the 1960s, and has become a standard term widely used in scientific literature, teaching, drug regulations, and clinical practice.

ADME describes the disposition of a pharmaceutical compound within an organism. The four criteria all influence the drug levels and kinetics of drug exposure to the tissues and hence influence the performance and pharmacological activity of the compound as a drug. Sometimes liberation and/or toxicity are also considered, yielding LADME, ADMET, or LADMET.

== Components ==
=== Absorption/administration ===
For a compound to reach a tissue, it usually must be taken into the bloodstream – often via mucous surfaces like the digestive tract (intestinal absorption) – before being taken up by the target cells. Factors such as poor compound solubility, gastric emptying time, intestinal transit time, chemical instability in the stomach, and inability to permeate the intestinal wall can all reduce the extent to which a drug is absorbed after oral administration. Absorption critically determines the compound's bioavailability. Drugs that absorb poorly when taken orally must be administered in some less desirable way, like intravenously or by inhalation (e.g. zanamivir). Routes of administration are an important consideration.

=== Distribution ===
The compound needs to be carried to its effector site, most often via the bloodstream. From there, the compound may distribute into muscle and organs, usually to differing extents. After entry into the systemic circulation, either by intravascular injection or by absorption from any of the various extracellular sites, the drug is subjected to numerous distribution processes that tend to lower its plasma concentration.

Distribution is defined as the reversible transfer of a drug between one compartment to another. Some factors affecting drug distribution include regional blood flow rates, molecular size, polarity and binding to serum proteins, forming a complex. Distribution can be a serious problem at some natural barriers like the blood–brain barrier.

=== Metabolism ===
Compounds begin to break down as soon as they enter the body. The majority of small-molecule drug metabolism is carried out in the liver by redox enzymes, termed cytochrome P450 enzymes. As metabolism occurs, the initial (parent) compound is converted to new compounds called metabolites. When metabolites are pharmacologically inert, metabolism deactivates the administered dose of parent drug and this usually reduces the effects on the body. Metabolites may also be pharmacologically active, sometimes more so than the parent drug (see prodrug).

=== Excretion ===
Compounds and their metabolites need to be removed from the body via excretion, usually through the kidneys (urine) or in the feces. Unless excretion is complete, accumulation of foreign substances can adversely affect normal metabolism.

There are three main sites where drug excretion occurs. The kidney is the most important site and it is where products are excreted through urine. Biliary excretion or fecal excretion is the process that initiates in the liver and passes through to the gut until the products are finally excreted along with waste products or feces. The last main method of excretion is through the lungs (e.g. anesthetic gases).

Excretion of drugs by the kidney involves 3 main mechanisms:

- Glomerular filtration of unbound drug.
- Active secretion of (free & protein-bound) drug by transporters (e.g. anions such as urate, penicillin, glucuronide, sulfate conjugates) or cations such as choline, histamine.
- Filtrate 100-fold concentrated in tubules for a favorable concentration gradient so that it may be secreted by passive diffusion and passed out through the urine.

== Toxicity ==
Sometimes, the potential or real toxicity of the compound is taken into account (ADME-Tox or ADMET). Parameters used to characterize toxicity include the median lethal dose (LD_{50}) and therapeutic index.

Computational chemists try to predict the ADME-Tox qualities of compounds through methods like QSPR or QSAR.

The route of administration critically influences ADME.

== See also ==
- Bioavailability
- Blood plasma
- Caco-2
- Cheminformatics
- Combinatorial chemistry
- Drug metabolism
- Lipinski's rule of five
- Parallel artificial membrane permeability assay
- Simcyp Simulator
- Simulations Plus
- Solubility
