= Liberation (pharmacology) =

Pharmacological term

Release (Liberation) is the first step in the process by which medication enters the body and liberates the active ingredient that has been administered. The pharmaceutical drug must separate from the vehicle or the excipient that it was mixed with during manufacture. Some authors split the process of liberation into three steps: disintegration, disaggregation and dissolution. A limiting factor in the adsorption of pharmaceutical drugs is the degree to which they are ionized, as cell membranes are relatively impermeable to ionized molecules.

The characteristics of a medication's excipient play a fundamental role in creating a suitable environment for the correct absorption of a drug. This can mean that the same dose of a drug in different forms can have different bioequivalence, as they yield different plasma concentrations and therefore have different therapeutic effects. Dosage forms with modified release (such as delayed or extended release) allow this difference to be usefully applied.

== Dissolution ==
In a typical situation, a pill taken orally will pass through the oesophagus and into the stomach. As the stomach has an aqueous environment, it is the first place where the pill can dissolve. The rate of dissolution is a key element in controlling the duration of a drug's effect. For this reason, different forms of the same medication can have the same active ingredients but different dissolution rates. If a drug is administered in a form that is not rapidly dissolved, the drug will be absorbed more gradually over time and its action will have a longer duration. A consequence of this is that patients will comply more closely to a prescribed course of treatment, if the medication does not have to be taken as frequently. In addition, a slow release system will maintain drug concentrations within a therapeutically acceptable range for longer than quicker releasing delivery systems as these result in more pronounced peaks in plasma concentration.

The dissolution rate is described by the Noyes–Whitney equation:

$\frac{dW}{dt} = \frac{DA(C_{s}-C)}{L}$

Where:

- $\frac{dW}{dt}$ is the dissolution rate.
- A is the solid's surface area.
- C is the concentration of the solid in the bulk dissolution medium.
- $C_{s}$ is the concentration of the solid in the diffusion layer surrounding the solid.
- D is the diffusion coefficient.
- L is the thickness of the diffusion layer.

As the solution is already in a dissolved state, it does not have to go through a dissolution stage before absorption begins.

== Ionization ==
Cell membranes present a greater barrier to the movement of ionized molecules than non-ionized liposoluble substances. This is particularly important for substances that are weakly amphoteric. The stomach's acidic pH and the subsequent alkalization in the intestine modifies the degree of ionization of acids and weak bases depending on a substance's pKa. The pKa is the pH at which a substance is present at an equilibrium between ionized and non-ionized molecules. The Henderson–Hasselbalch equation is used to calculate pKa.

== See also ==
- Absorption (pharmacokinetics)
- ADME
- Bioequivalence
- Distribution (pharmacology)
- Elimination (pharmacology)
- Generic drugs
- Metabolism
- Pharmacodynamics
- Pharmacokinetics
- Pharmacy
