= C12H14ClNO =

The molecular formula C_{12}H_{14}ClNO may refer to:

- 3-Chloro-N-cyclopropylcathinone
- Norketamine
- Ketamir-2
