= C16H23N =

The molecular formula C_{16}H_{23}N may refer to:

- PCPEP
- Rolicyclidine
