= Trough level =

Concentration of a drug in the blood before the next dose is administered

In medicine and pharmacology, a trough level or trough concentration (C_{trough}) is the concentration reached by a drug immediately before the next dose is administered, often used in therapeutic drug monitoring. The name comes from the idea that on a graph of concentration versus time, the line forms a U-shaped trough at the lowest region, before a new dose sends it higher again. The usual criterion is concentration in the blood serum, although in some instances local concentration within tissues is relevant. It is pharmacokinetically normal that over time, the drug molecules are being metabolized or cleared by the body, so the concentration of drug that remains available is dropping. In a medicine that is administered periodically, the trough level should be measured just before the administration of the next dose in order to avoid overdosing. A trough level is contrasted with a "peak level" (C_{max}), which is the highest level of the medicine in the body, and the "average level", which is the mean level over time. It is widely used in clinical trials for newer medicines to investigate therapeutic effectiveness and safety.

C_{trough} is slightly different from C_{min}, the minimum concentration during the time interval between administration of two doses.
