= TPSA =

TPSA may refer to:

- Theoretical Physics Student Association, a student-led organisation founded to enhance the academic success of students of theoretical physics.
- Orange Polska, a Polish national telecommunications provider.
- Topological polar surface area, a physicochemical property describing the polarity of molecules
- Third-party security assessment, an assessment of a third-party's security posture, or alternatively, a security assessment performed by a third-party entity
