= Polar surface area =

Chemical property measurement

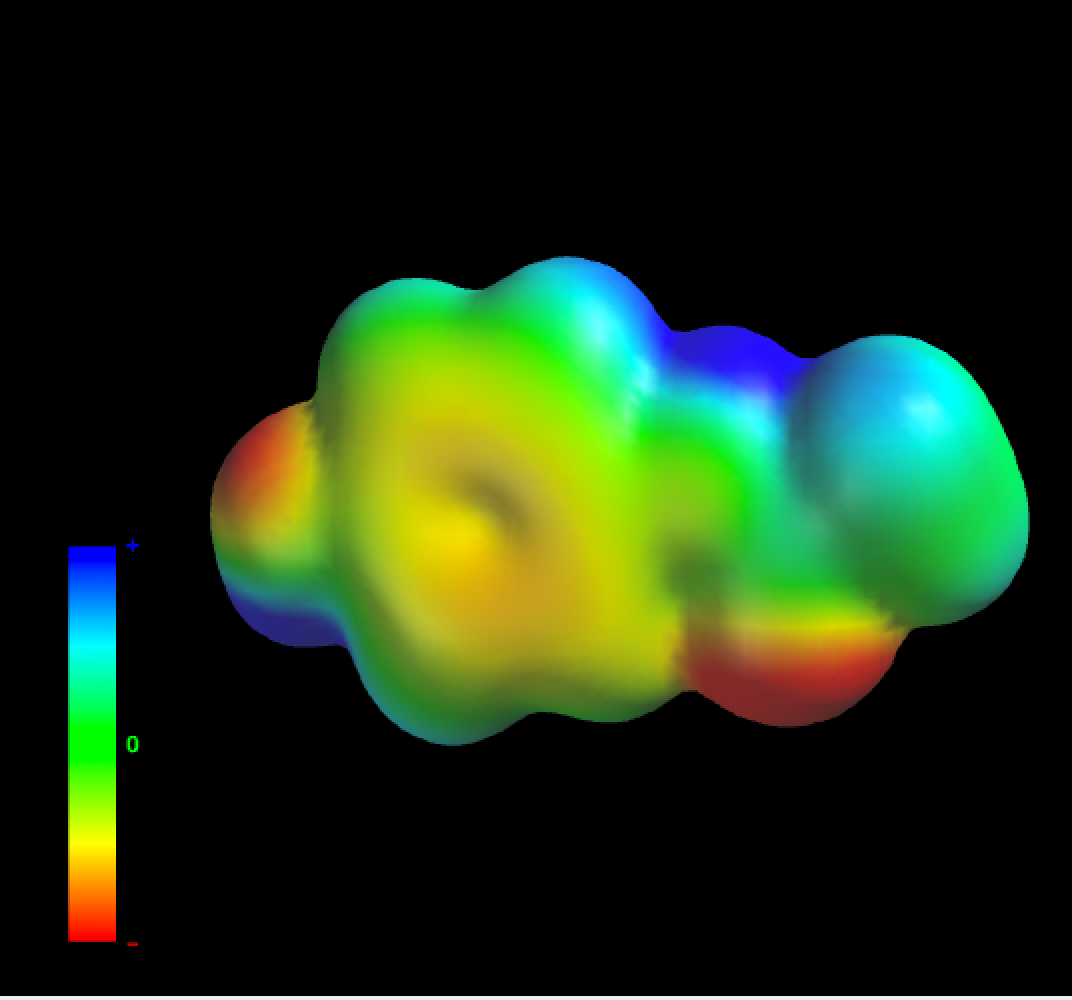
Electrical potential surface of paracetamol showing polar areas in red and blue

The polar surface area (PSA) is the portion of a molecule's surface associated with polar atoms, chiefly oxygen and nitrogen, together with the hydrogen atoms bonded to them; depending on the calculation, other polar atoms such as sulfur and phosphorus may also be included. Topological polar surface area (TPSA) is a related descriptor derived from fragment contributions of polar atoms, primarily oxygen and nitrogen, also including their attached hydrogen atoms.

PSA is a commonly used medicinal chemistry metric for the optimization of a drug's ability to permeate cells. Molecules with a polar surface area of greater than 140 angstroms squared (Å^{2}) tend to be poor at permeating cell membranes. For molecules to penetrate the blood–brain barrier (and thus act on receptors in the central nervous system), a PSA less than 90 Å^{2} is usually needed.

TPSA is a valuable tool in drug discovery and development. By analyzing a drug candidate's TPSA, scientists can predict its potential for oral bioavailability and ability to reach target sites within the body. This prediction hinges on a drug's ability to permeate biological barriers.

Permeating these barriers, such as the Blood-Brain Barrier (BBB), the Placental Barrier (PB), and the Blood-Mammary Barrier (BM), is crucial for many drugs to reach their intended targets.

The BBB, for example, protects the brain from harmful substances. Drugs with a lower TPSA (generally below 90 Å²) tend to permeate the BBB more easily, allowing them to reach the brain and exert their therapeutic effects (Shityakov et al., 2013).

Similarly, for drugs intended to treat the fetus, a lower TPSA (below 60 Å²) is preferred to ensure they can pass through the placenta (Augustiño-Roubina et al., 2019).

Breastfeeding mothers also need consideration. Here, an optimal TPSA for a drug is around 60-80 Å² to allow it to reach the breast tissue for milk production, while drugs exceeding 90 Å² are less likely to permeate the Blood-Mammary Barrier.

== See also ==
- Biopharmaceutics Classification System
- Cheminformatics
  - Chemistry Development Kit
  - JOELib
- Implicit solvation
- Lipinski's rule of five

== Literature ==
- Pajouhesh, Hassan; Lenz, George R (2005). "Medicinal chemical properties of successful central nervous system drugs". NeuroRx. 2 (4): 541–553. doi:10.1602/neurorx.2.4.541. PMC 1201314. PMID 16489364.
- Clark, David E (1999). "Rapid calculation of polar molecular surface area and its application to the prediction of transport phenomena. 1. Prediction of intestinal absorption". Journal of Pharmaceutical Sciences. 88 (8): 807–14. doi:10.1021/js9804011. PMID 10430547.
- Palm, Katrin; Stenberg, Patric; Luthman, Kristina; Artursson1, Per (1997). "Polar molecular surface properties predict the intestinal absorption of drugs in humans". Pharmaceutical Research. 14 (5): 568–71. doi:10.1023/A:1012188625088. PMID 9165525. S2CID 7178582.
- Ertl, Peter; Rohde, Bernhard; Selzer, Paul (2000). "Fast Calculation of Molecular Polar Surface Area as a Sum of Fragment-Based Contributions and Its Application to the Prediction of Drug Transport Properties". Journal of Medicinal Chemistry. 43 (20): 3714–3717. doi:10.1021/jm000942e. PMID 11020286.
- Ertl, P. Polar Surface Area, in Molecular Drug Properties, R. Mannhold (ed), Wiley-VCH, pp. 111–126, 2007
- Shityakov, Sergey; Neuhaus, Winfried; Dandekar, Thomas; Förster, Carola (2013). "Analysing molecular polar surface descriptors to predict blood-brain barrier permeation". International Journal of Computational Biology and Drug Design. 6 (1–2): 146–56. doi:10.1504/IJCBDD.2013.052195. PMID 23428480.
