= Pharmaceutical physician =

Profession

A Pharmaceutical Physician is a healthcare professional, usually a medical physician, who works in drug development. They work in biotechnology companies, Clinical Research Organisations (CROs), Regulatory Authorities, and pharmaceutical companies.

== Role ==
Pharmaceutical physicians' primary role is to inform others about development of new treatments, newly established products dealing with the pharmaceutical industry, and to help with medical need. Pharmaceutical physicians must make sure that all of the materials comply with Pharmaceutical Medicines Code of Practice Authority (PMCPA).

== Types ==
- Clinical pharmacologist or Phase I physician- works with chemists, biochemists, pharmacologists and toxicologists on drug development.
- Clinical research physician (CRP) or Phase II/III physician- examines newly used chemical or biological products on patients.
- Medical adviser (MA)- works with marketing and sales people to commercialize their company.

== History ==
Pharmaceutical physicians were first recruited after the second World War to fluctuate medical aspects of drug development. British Association of Pharmaceutical Physicians was the first industry composed of pharmaceutical physicians. It was created in 1957 in Britain.
