= PCPEP =

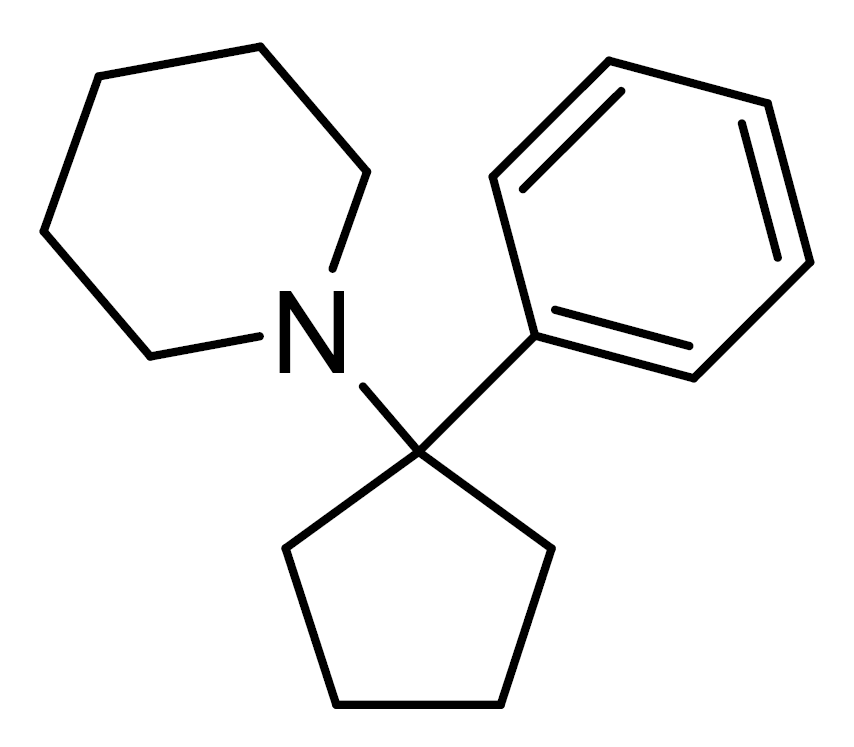

Identifiers
- IUPAC name: 1-(1-phenylcyclopentyl)piperidine
- CAS Number: 23036-19-3
- PubChem CID: 13015299
- CompTox Dashboard (EPA): DTXSID80515243

Chemical and physical data
- Formula: C_{16}H_{23}N
- Molar mass: 229.367 g·mol^{−1}
- 3D model (JSmol): Interactive image
- SMILES: C1CCN(CC1)C2(CCCC2)C3=CC=CC=C3
- InChI: InChI=1S/C16H23N/c1-3-9-15(10-4-1)16(11-5-6-12-16)17-13-7-2-8-14-17/h1,3-4,9-10H,2,5-8,11-14H2; Key:KNZVHCGBSJFKIX-UHFFFAOYSA-N

PCPEP (1-phenyl-1-piperidinylcyclopentane) is a designer drug from the arylcyclohexylamine family, which has dissociative effects. It is the ring-contracted cyclopentyl homologue of PCP and has around 1/10th the potency of PCP, making it a similar potency to ketamine. It has been sold as an illicit drug in Japan.

== See also ==
- Ketamir
