= Rate of infusion =

In pharmacokinetics, the rate of infusion (or dosing rate) refers not just to the rate at which a drug is administered, but the desired rate at which a drug should be administered to achieve a steady state of a fixed dose which has been demonstrated to be therapeutically effective.

Abbreviations include K_{in}, K_{0}, or R_{0}.

It can be calculated as the steady-state concentration in the plasma multiplied by the clearance:

$\textstyle K_{in} = C_{ss} \cdot CL$
