= Absorption rate constant =

Rate at which a drug enters a system

The absorption rate constant K_{a} is a value used in pharmacokinetics to describe the rate at which a drug enters into the system. It is expressed in units of time^{−1}. The K_{a} is related to the absorption half-life (t_{1/2a}) per the following equation: K_{a} = ln(2) / t_{1/2a}.

K_{a} values can typically only be found in research articles. This is in contrast to parameters like bioavailability and elimination half-life, which can often be found in drug and pharmacology handbooks.
