= Parallel artificial membrane permeability assay =

In medicinal chemistry, parallel artificial membrane permeability assay (PAMPA) is a method which determines the permeability of substances from a donor compartment, through a lipid-infused artificial membrane into an acceptor compartment. A multi-well microtitre plate is used for the donor and a membrane/acceptor compartment is placed on top; the whole assembly is commonly referred to as a “sandwich”. At the beginning of the test, the drug is added to the donor compartment, and the acceptor compartment is drug-free. After an incubation period which may include stirring, the sandwich is separated and the amount of drug is measured in each compartment. Mass balance allows calculation of drug that remains in the membrane.

== Applications ==
To date, PAMPA models have been developed that exhibit a high degree of correlation with permeation across a variety of barriers, including Caco-2 cultures, the gastrointestinal tract, blood–brain barrier and skin.

The donor and/or acceptor compartments may contain solubilizing agents, or additives that bind the drugs as they permeate. To improve the in vitro - in vivo correlation and performance of the PAMPA method, the lipid, pH and chemical composition of the system is often designed with biomimetic considerations in mind.

Although active transport is not modeled by the artificial PAMPA membrane, up to 95% of known drugs are absorbed by passive transport. Some experts support a lower figure, so the amount is open to some interpretation. Microtiter plates with 96 wells can be used for the assay which increases the speed and lowers the per sample cost.

== Commercialization ==
Since the first publication by Kansy and coworkers, several companies developed their own versions of the assay. Early models incorporated iso-pH conditions in the compartments separated by a simple lipid membrane; subsequently, commercial products were introduced which incorporated more sophisticated lipid membranes. The commercial products helped ensure that medicinal chemists across different corporate labs within a worldwide organization used the same standardized methodology, reagents and obtained equivalent system performance as demonstrated with a set of test compounds. This has proved very useful as various operational activities have been outsourced to other countries.

== See also ==
- Caco-2 cell-based permeability
- Drug development
- Drug discovery
- Lipid bilayer
