= Elimination rate constant =

The elimination rate constant K or K_{e} is a value used in pharmacokinetics to describe the rate at which a drug is removed from the human system.

It is often abbreviated K or K_{e}. It is equivalent to the fraction of a substance that is removed per unit time measured at any particular instant and has units of T^{−1}. This can be expressed mathematically with the differential equation

$$C_{t+dt} = C_t - C_t \cdot K \cdot dt$$,

where $C_t$ is the blood plasma concentration of drug in the system at a given point in time $t$, $dt$ is an infinitely small change in time, and $C_{t+dt}$ is the concentration of drug in the system after the infinitely small change in time.

The solution of this differential equation is useful in calculating the concentration after the administration of a single dose of drug via IV bolus injection:

$$C_t = C_{0}\cdot e^{-Kt} \,$$

- C_{t} is concentration after time t
- C_{0} is the initial concentration (t=0)
- K is the elimination rate constant

== Derivation ==
In first-order (linear) kinetics, the plasma concentration $C_t$ of a drug at a given time t after single dose administration via IV bolus injection is given by;

$C_t = \frac{C_{0}}{2^\frac{t}{t_{1/2}}} \,$

where:

- C_{0} is the initial concentration (at t=0)
- t_{1/2} is the half-life time of the drug, which is the time needed for the plasma drug concentration to drop to its half

Therefore, the amount of drug present in the body at time t $A_t$ is;

$A_t=V_d\cdot C_t=V_d\cdot{\frac {C_{0}}{2^{\frac {t}{t_{1/2}}}}}\,$

where V_{d} is the apparent volume of distribution

Then, the amount eliminated from the body after time t $E_t$ is;

$E_t=V_{d}\cdot{C_{0}}\Biggl(1-{\frac {1}{2^{\frac {t}{t_{1/2}}}}}\Biggr)\,$

Then, the rate of elimination at time t is given by the derivative of this function with respect to t;

${dE_t \over dt}={\frac {\ln2\cdot{V_{d}\cdot {C_{0}}}}{{2^{\frac {t}{t_{1/2}}}\cdot{t_{1/2}}}}\,}$

And since $K$ is fraction of the drug that is removed per unit time measured at any particular instant, then if we divide the rate of elimination by the amount of drug in the body at time t, we get;

$K={dE_t \over dt}\div A_t=\frac {\ln2}{t_{1/2}}\approx \frac {0.693}{t_{1/2}}$
