= Bioavailability =

Pharmacological measurement

In pharmacology, bioavailability is a subcategory of absorption and is the fraction (%) of an administered drug that reaches the systemic circulation.

By definition, when a medication is administered intravenously, its bioavailability is 100%. However, when a medication is administered through other routes, its bioavailability is lower due to intestinal epithelium absorption and first-pass metabolism. Thereby, mathematically, bioavailability equals the ratio of comparing the area under the plasma drug concentration curve versus time (AUC) for the extravascular formulation to the AUC for the intravascular formulation. AUC is used because AUC is proportional to the dose that has entered the systemic circulation.

Bioavailability of a drug is an average value; to take population variability into account, deviation range is shown as ±. To ensure that the drug taker who has poor absorption is dosed appropriately, the bottom value of the deviation range is employed to represent real bioavailability and to calculate the drug dose needed for the drug taker to achieve systemic concentrations similar to the intravenous formulation. To dose without knowing the drug taker's absorption rate, the bottom value of the deviation range is used in order to ensure the intended efficacy, unless the drug is associated with a narrow therapeutic window.

For dietary supplements, herbs and other nutrients in which the route of administration is nearly always oral, bioavailability generally designates simply the quantity or fraction of the ingested dose that is absorbed.

== Definitions ==
In both pharmacology and nutrition sciences, bioavailability is measured by calculating the area under curve (AUC) of the drug concentration time profile.

=== In pharmacology ===
Bioavailability is a term used to describe the percentage of an administered dose of a xenobiotic that reaches the systemic circulation unchanged. It is usually denoted by the letter F and expressed as a percentage, but it can also be expressed as a fraction or represented by a lowercase f.

=== In nutritional science ===
In nutritional science, which covers the intake of nutrients and non-drug dietary ingredients, the concept of bioavailability lacks the well-defined standards associated with the pharmaceutical industry. The pharmacological definition cannot apply to these substances because utilization and absorption is a function of the nutritional status and physiological state of the subject, resulting in even greater differences from individual to individual (inter-individual variation). Therefore, bioavailability for dietary supplements can be defined as the proportion of the administered substance capable of being absorbed and available for use or storage.

== Absolute bioavailability ==
Absolute bioavailability is a ratio of areas under the curves. IV, intravenous; PO, oral route. C is plasma concentration (arbitrary units).

Absolute bioavailability compares the bioavailability of the active drug in systemic circulation following non-intravenous administration (i.e., after oral, buccal, ocular, nasal, rectal, transdermal, subcutaneous, or sublingual administration), with the bioavailability of the same drug following intravenous administration. It is the fraction of exposure to a drug (AUC) through non-intravenous administration compared with the corresponding intravenous administration of the same drug. The comparison must be dose normalized (e.g., account for different doses or varying weights of the subjects); consequently, the amount absorbed is corrected by dividing the corresponding dose administered.

In pharmacology, in order to determine absolute bioavailability of a drug, a pharmacokinetic study must be done to obtain a plasma drug concentration vs time plot for the drug after both intravenous (iv) and extravascular (non-intravenous, i.e., oral) administration. The absolute bioavailability is the dose-corrected area under curve (AUC) non-intravenous divided by AUC intravenous. The formula for calculating the absolute bioavailability, F, of a drug administered orally (po) is given below (where D is dose administered).

$$F_\mathrm{abs} = 100 \cdot \frac{AUC_\mathrm{po} \cdot D_\mathrm{iv}}{AUC_\mathrm{iv} \cdot D_\mathrm{po}}$$

Therefore, a drug given by the intravenous route will have an absolute bioavailability of 100% (f = 1), whereas drugs given by other routes usually have an absolute bioavailability of less than one. If we compare the two different dosage forms having same active ingredients and compare the two drug bioavailability is called comparative bioavailability.

Although knowing the true extent of systemic absorption (referred to as absolute bioavailability) is clearly useful, in practice it is not determined as frequently as one may think. The reason for this is that its assessment requires an intravenous reference; that is, a route of administration that guarantees all of the administered drug reaches systemic circulation. Such studies come at considerable cost, not least of which is the necessity to conduct preclinical toxicity tests to ensure adequate safety, as well as potential problems due to solubility limitations. These limitations may be overcome, however, by administering a very low dose (typically a few micrograms) of an isotopically labelled drug concomitantly with a therapeutic non-isotopically labelled oral dose (the isotopically labelled intravenous dose is sufficiently low so as not to perturb the systemic drug concentrations achieved from the non-labelled oral dose). The intravenous and oral concentrations can then be deconvoluted by virtue of their different isotopic constitution, and can thus be used to determine the oral and intravenous pharmacokinetics from the same dose administration. This technique eliminates pharmacokinetic issues with non-equivalent clearance as well as enabling the intravenous dose to be administered with a minimum of toxicology and formulation. The technique was first applied using stable-isotopes such as ^{13}C and mass-spectrometry to distinguish the isotopes by mass difference. More recently, ^{14}C labelled drugs are administered intravenously and accelerator mass spectrometry (AMS) used to measure the isotopically labelled drug along with mass spectrometry for the unlabelled drug.

There is no regulatory requirement to define the intravenous pharmacokinetics or absolute bioavailability however regulatory authorities do sometimes ask for absolute bioavailability information of the extravascular route in cases in which the bioavailability is apparently low or variable and there is a proven relationship between the pharmacodynamics and the pharmacokinetics at therapeutic doses. In all such cases, to conduct an absolute bioavailability study requires that the drug be given intravenously.

Intravenous administration of a developmental drug can provide valuable information on the fundamental pharmacokinetic parameters of volume of distribution (V) and clearance (CL).

== Relative bioavailability and bioequivalence ==
In pharmacology, relative bioavailability measures the bioavailability (estimated as the AUC) of a formulation (A) of a certain drug when compared with another formulation (B) of the same drug, usually an established standard, or through administration via a different route. When the standard consists of intravenously administered drug, this is known as absolute bioavailability (see above).

$$F_\mathrm{rel} = 100 \cdot \frac{AUC_\mathrm{A} \cdot D_\mathrm{B}}{AUC_\mathrm{B} \cdot D_\mathrm{A}}$$

Relative bioavailability is one of the measures used to assess bioequivalence (BE) between two drug products. For FDA approval, a generic manufacturer must demonstrate that the 90% confidence interval for the ratio of the mean responses (usually of AUC and the maximum concentration, C_{max}) of its product to that of the "brand name drug" is within the limits of 80% to 125%. Where AUC refers to the concentration of the drug in the blood over time t = 0 to t = ∞, C_{max} refers to the maximum concentration of the drug in the blood. When T_{max} is given, it refers to the time it takes for a drug to reach C_{max}.

While the mechanisms by which a formulation affects bioavailability and bioequivalence have been extensively studied in drugs, formulation factors that influence bioavailability and bioequivalence in nutritional supplements are largely unknown. As a result, in nutritional sciences, relative bioavailability or bioequivalence is the most common measure of bioavailability, comparing the bioavailability of one formulation of the same dietary ingredient to another.

== Factors influencing bioavailability ==
The absolute bioavailability of a drug, when administered by an extravascular route, is usually less than one (i.e., F< 100%). Various physiological factors reduce the availability of drugs prior to their entry into the systemic circulation. Whether a drug is taken with or without food will also affect absorption, other drugs taken concurrently may alter absorption and first-pass metabolism, intestinal motility alters the dissolution of the drug and may affect the degree of chemical degradation of the drug by intestinal microflora. Disease states affecting liver metabolism or gastrointestinal function will also have an effect.

Other factors may include, but are not limited to:

- Physical properties of the drug (hydrophobicity, pKa, solubility)
- The drug formulation (immediate release, excipients used, manufacturing methods, modified release – delayed release, extended release, sustained release, etc.)
- Whether the formulation is administered in a fed or fasted state
- Gastric emptying rate
- Circadian differences
- Interactions with other drugs/foods:
  - Interactions with other drugs (e.g., antacids, alcohol, nicotine)
  - Interactions with other foods (e.g., grapefruit juice, pomello, cranberry juice, brassica vegetables)
- Transporters: Substrate of efflux transporters (e.g. P-glycoprotein)
- Health of the gastrointestinal tract
- Enzyme induction/inhibition by other drugs/foods:
  - Enzyme induction (increased rate of metabolism), e.g., Phenytoin induces CYP1A2, CYP2C9, CYP2C19, and CYP3A4
  - Enzyme inhibition (decreased rate of metabolism), e.g., grapefruit juice inhibits CYP3A → higher nifedipine concentrations
- Individual variation in metabolic differences
  - Age: In general, drugs are metabolized more slowly in fetal, neonatal, and geriatric populations
  - Phenotypic differences, enterohepatic circulation, diet, gender
- Disease state
  - E.g., hepatic insufficiency, poor renal function

Each of these factors may vary from patient to patient (inter-individual variation), and indeed in the same patient over time (intra-individual variation). In clinical trials, inter-individual variation is a critical measurement used to assess the bioavailability differences from patient to patient in order to ensure predictable dosing.

== See also ==
- ADME-Tox
- Biopharmaceutics Classification System
- Bioavailability (soil)
- Caco-2
- Lipinski's Rule of 5

== Notes ==
TH: One of the few exceptions where a drug shows F of over 100% is theophylline. If administered as an oral solution F is 111%, since the drug is completely absorbed and first-pass metabolism in the lung after intravenous administration is bypassed.
OB: Reference listed drug products (i.e., innovator's) as well as generic drug products that have been approved based on an Abbreviated New Drug Application are given in FDA's Orange Book.

== Sources ==
- Rowland, Malcolm; Tozer, N. (2010). Clinical Pharmacokinetics and Pharmacodynamics: Concepts and Applications (4 ed.). Philadelphia, PA: Lippincott Williams & Wilkins. ISBN 978-0-7817-5009-7.
- Welling, Peter G.; Tse, Francis L. S.; Dighe, Shrikant V. (1991). Pharmaceutical Bioequivalence. Drugs and the Pharmaceutical Sciences. Vol. 48. New York, NY: Marcel Dekker. ISBN 978-0-8247-8484-3.
- Hauschke, Dieter; Steinijans, Volker; Pigeot, Iris (2007). "Metrics to characterize concentration-time profiles in single- and multiple-dose bioequivalence studies". Bioequivalence Studies in Drug Development: Methods and Applications. Statistics in Practice. Chichester, UK: John Wiley and Sons. pp. 17–36. ISBN 978-0-470-09475-4.
- Chow, Shein-Chung; Liu, Jen-pei (15 October 2008). Design and Analysis of Bioavailability and Bioequivalence Studies. Biostatistics Series. Vol. 27 (3rd ed.). FL: CRC Press. ISBN 978-1-58488-668-6.
