= IVIVC =

An in-vitro in-vivo correlation (IVIVC) has been defined by the U.S. Food and Drug Administration (FDA) as "a predictive mathematical model describing the relationship between an in-vitro property of a dosage form and an in-vivo response".

Generally, the in-vitro property is the rate or extent of drug dissolution or release while the in-vivo response is the plasma drug concentration or amount of drug absorbed. The United States Pharmacopoeia (USP) also defines IVIVC as "the establishment of a relationship between a biological property, or a parameter derived from a biological property produced from a dosage form, and a physicochemical property of the same dosage form".

Typically, the parameter derived from the biological property is AUC or Cmax, while the physicochemical property is the in vitro dissolution profile.

The main roles of IVIVC are:

1. To use dissolution test as a surrogate for human studies.
2. To supports and/or validate the use of dissolution methods and specifications.
3. To assist in quality control during manufacturing and selecting appropriate formulations

== Example of a correlation model ==
$\operatorname{Fabs} = \operatorname{AbsScale} \times \operatorname{Diss} \times (\operatorname{t_{scale}} \times \operatorname{t_{vivo}} - \operatorname{t_{shift}}) - \operatorname{AbsBase},$

where

- AbsScale: assess the deviations of points around the regression line, particularly around the last data points
- AbsBase: assess the X intercept of the regression line, i.e. does it cross at zero, zero if not you may need to use this variable for some baseline
- t_{scale}: assess the regression line to see if time in vitro needs to be scaled to correlate with time in vivo
- t_{shift}: assess the X intercept of the regression line, i.e. does it cross at zero, if not you may need to use this to account for a Lag in absorption

Fabs vs. Fdiss Plots and Levy Plots can be used to help determine which of these variables may be applicable.

== Sources ==
- The United States Pharmacopeia. (23rd ed.). (1995). "In Vitro and In Vivo Evaluation of Dosage form < 1088>". 1824-1929. Rockville, Maryland.
- Shargel, L., and Yu, A. B. C. (1993). Applied Biopharmaceutics and Pharmacokinetics. East Norwalk, Connecticut: Appleton & Lange.
- Polli, J.E., Rekhi, G.S., Augsburger. L.L., and Shah, V.P. (1997): Methods to compare dissolution profiles and a rationale for wide dissolution specifications for metoprolol tartrate tablets. J. Pharm. Sci. 86:690-700.
- Drewe, J., and Guitard, P. (1993). "In vitro-in vivo correlation for modified-release formulations". Journal of Pharmaceutical Sciences. 82(2), 132-137.
- Marival Bermejo (2002) Dissolution Methodologies and IVIVC http://www.uv.es/~mbermejo/DissolutionC.pdf
