= Caco-2 =

Immortalized cell line of human cancer cells

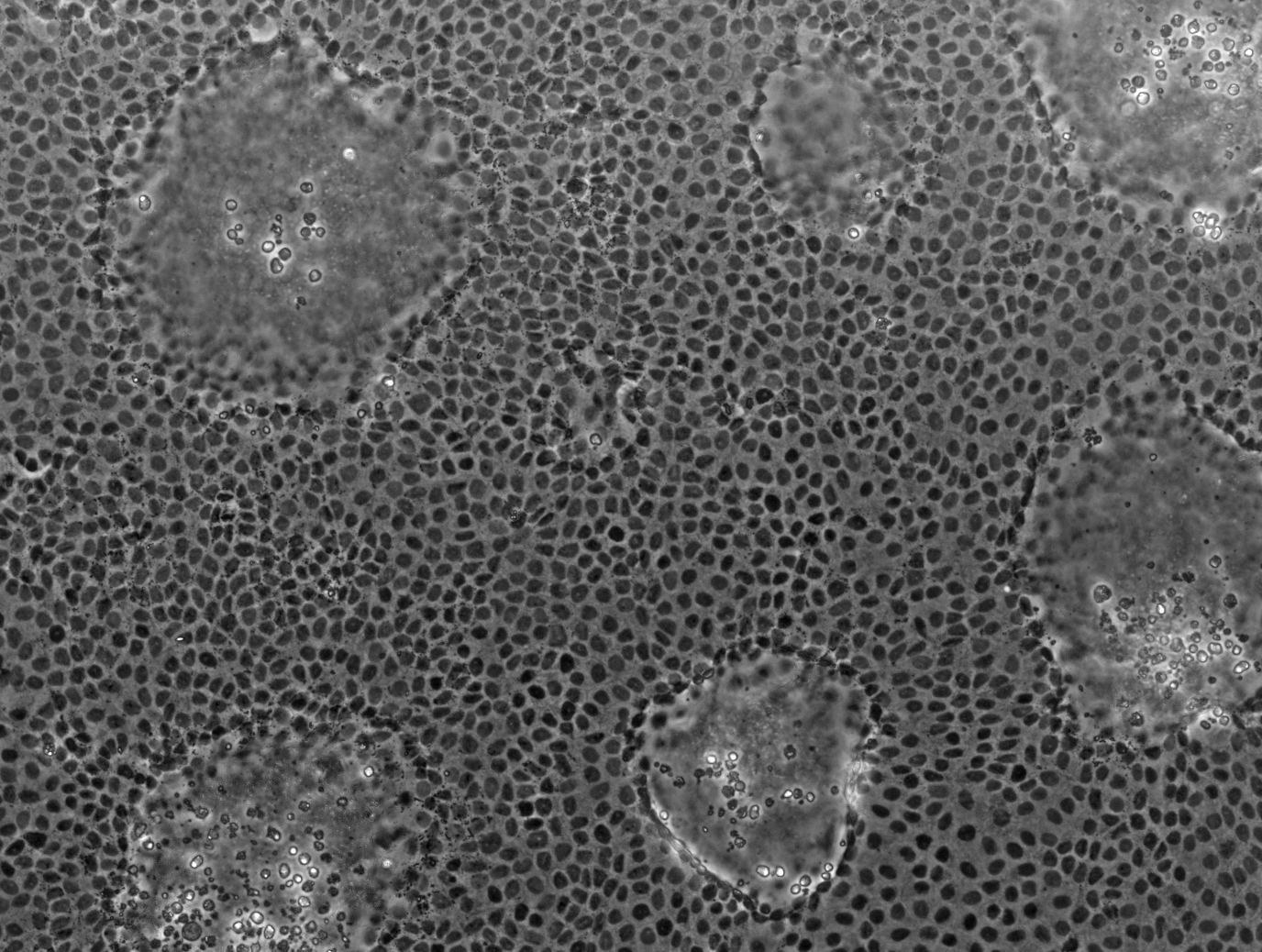
Phase contrast micrograph of confluent Caco-2 cells

Caco-2 (from Cancer coli, "colon cancer") is an immortalized cell line of human colorectal adenocarcinoma cells. It is primarily used as a model of the intestinal epithelial barrier. In culture, Caco-2 cells spontaneously differentiate into a heterogeneous mixture of intestinal epithelial cells. It was developed in 1977 by Jorgen Fogh at the Sloan-Kettering Institute for Cancer Research.

== History ==
The line was developed in 1977 by Jorgen Fogh at the Sloan-Kettering Institute for Cancer Research. The research application of Caco-2 cells was developed during the 1980s by Alain Zweibaum group at INSERM, France as well as Ismael Hidalgo, at the Borchardt laboratory, University of Kansas and Thomas J Raub and at the Upjohn Company. The first publication of the discovery of the spontaneous enterocyte like differentiation was published by Alain Zweibaum group in 1983.

== Characteristics ==
Although derived from a colon (large intestine) carcinoma, when cultured under specific conditions the cells become differentiated and polarized such that their phenotype, morphologically and functionally, resembles the enterocytes lining the small intestine. Polarized Caco-2 cells express tight junctions, microvilli, and a number of enzymes and transporters that are characteristic of such enterocytes: peptidases, esterases, P-glycoprotein, uptake transporters for amino acids, bile acids, carboxylic acids, etc.

== Research applications ==
Microscopically, Caco-2 cell cultures show obvious heterogeneity likely reflecting the complex mixture of cells found in the epithelial lining of the large and small intestine i.e. enterocytes, enteroendocrine cells, goblet cells, transit amplifying cells, paneth cells and intestinal stem cells. Over time, the characteristics of the cells used in different laboratories have diverged, introducing inter-laboratory variation. Despite such heterogeneity, Caco-2 cells are used in cell invasion studies, viral transfection research, and lipid transport.

Caco-2 cells may be used as a confluent monolayer on a cell culture insert filter (e.g., Transwell). In this format, Caco-2 cells form a polarized epithelial cell monolayer that provides a physical and biochemical barrier to the passage of ions and small molecules. The Caco-2 monolayer can be used as an in vitro model of the human small intestinal mucosa to predict the absorption of orally administered drugs. Kits, such as the CacoReady, have been developed to simplify this procedure. A correlation between the in vitro apparent permeability across Caco-2 monolayers and the in vivo fraction absorbed has been reported. Transwell diagram

== See also ==
- Cell culture
- Drug development
- Pre-clinical development
- PAMPA – a non cell-based permeability assay
