= Bioequivalence =

Similarity between preparations of a drug

A bioequivalency profile comparison of 150 mg extended-release bupropion as produced by Impax Laboratories for Teva and Biovail for GlaxoSmithKline

Bioequivalence is a term in pharmacokinetics used to assess the expected in vivo biological equivalence of two proprietary preparations of a drug. If two products are said to be bioequivalent it means that they would be expected to be, for all intents and purposes, the same.

One article defined bioequivalence by stating that, "two pharmaceutical products are bioequivalent if they are pharmaceutically equivalent and their bioavailabilities (rate and extent of availability) after administration in the same molar dose are similar to such a degree that their effects, with respect to both efficacy and safety, can be expected to be essentially the same. Pharmaceutical equivalence implies the same amount of the same active substance(s), in the same dosage form, for the same route of administration and meeting the same or comparable standards."

For The World Health Organization (WHO) "two pharmaceutical products are bioequivalent if they are pharmaceutically equivalent or pharmaceutical alternatives, and their bioavailabilities, in terms of rate (Cmax and tmax) and extent of absorption (area under the curve), after administration of the same molar dose under the same conditions, are similar to such a degree that their effects can be expected to be essentially the same".

The United States Food and Drug Administration (FDA) has defined bioequivalence as, "the absence of a significant difference in the rate and extent to which the active ingredient or active moiety in pharmaceutical equivalents or pharmaceutical alternatives becomes available at the site of drug action when administered at the same molar dose under similar conditions in an appropriately designed study."

== Bioequivalence ==
In determining bioequivalence between two products such as a commercially available Branded product and a potential to-be-marketed Generic product, pharmacokinetic studies are conducted whereby each of the preparations are administered in a cross-over study (sometimes parallel study, when a cross-over study is not feasible) to volunteer subjects, generally healthy individuals but occasionally in patients. Serum/plasma samples are obtained at prescribed times and assayed for parent drug (or occasionally metabolite) concentration. Occasionally, blood concentration levels are neither feasible or possible to compare the two products (e.g. inhaled corticosteroids), then pharmacodynamic endpoints rather than pharmacokinetic endpoints (see below) are used for comparison. For a pharmacokinetic comparison, the plasma concentration data are used to assess key pharmacokinetic parameters such as area under the curve (AUC), peak concentration (C_{max}), time to peak concentration (t_{max}), and absorption lag time (t_{lag}). Testing should be conducted at several different doses, especially when the drug displays non-linear pharmacokinetics.

In addition to data from bioequivalence studies, other data may need to be submitted to meet regulatory requirements for bioequivalence. Such evidence may include:

- analytical method validation
- in vitro-in vivo correlation studies (IVIVC)

== Regulatory definition ==
=== The World Health Organization ===
The World Health Organization considers two formulations bioequivalent if the 90% confidence interval for the ratio multisource (generic) product/comparator lie within 80.00–125.00% acceptance range for AUC_{0–t} and C_{max}. For high variable finished pharmaceutical products, the applicable acceptance range for C_{max} can be expanded (up to 69.84–143.19%).

=== Australia ===
In Australia, the Therapeutics Goods Administration (TGA) considers preparations to be bioequivalent if the 90% confidence intervals (90% CI) of the rate ratios, between the two preparations, of C_{max} and AUC lie in the range 0.80–1.25. T_{max} should also be similar between the products.

There are tighter requirements for drugs with a narrow therapeutic index and/or saturable metabolism – thus no generic products exist on the Australian market for digoxin or phenytoin for instance.

=== Europe ===
According to regulations applicable in the European Economic Area two medicinal products are bioequivalent if they are pharmaceutically equivalent or pharmaceutical alternatives and if their bioavailabilities after administration in the same molar dose are similar to such a degree that their effects, with respect to both efficacy and safety, will be essentially the same. This is considered demonstrated if the 90% confidence intervals (90% CI) of the ratios for AUC_{0–t} and C_{max} between the two preparations lie in the range 80–125%.

=== United States ===
The FDA considers two products bioequivalent if the 90% CI of the relative mean C_{max}, AUC_{(0–t)} and AUC_{(0–∞)} of the test (e.g. generic formulation) to reference (e.g. innovator brand formulation) should be within 80% to 125% in the fasting state. Although there are a few exceptions, generally a bioequivalent comparison of Test to Reference formulations also requires administration after an appropriate meal at a specified time before taking the drug, a so-called "fed" or "food-effect" study. A food-effect study requires the same statistical evaluation as the fasting study, described above.

=== China ===
Passing drugs may display this blue checkmark sign with the text 仿制药一致性评价 (Generic Drug Consistency Evaluation).

There were no requirements for bioequivalence in generic medications in China until the 2016 Opinion on Conducting Consistent Evaluation of the Quality and Efficacy of Generic Drugs (关于开展仿制药质量和疗效一致性评价的意见), which established basic rules for future bioequivalence work. Since July 2020, all newly approved generics must pass bioequivalence checks; previous drugs may apply to be checked. Since 2019, National Centralized Volume-Based Procurement uses "passes generic-consistency evalulation" as one of the bidding criteria.

The Chinese definition of "bioequivalence" entails having the test drug's geometric mean C_{max}, AUC_{(0–t)}, and AUC_{(0–∞)} fall into 80%–125% of the reference drug in both fasting and fed states. The reference drug should be preferably the original brand-name drug, then (if not available) an internationally recognized generic approved by a developed country, then (if still not available) an internationally recognized generic approved domestically – this is to avoid deviation from the original drug by serial use of generics as reference. If pharmacokinetic values such as C_{max} do not apply to the type of drug (e.g. if the drug is not absorbed orally), comparisons can be made using other means such as dose-response curves.

According to Wei et al. (2022), the Consistency Evaluation Policy increased R&D spending for Chinese pharmaceutical companies, especially among private and high-yielding ones. Liu et al. (2023) argue that the Policy increased the innovation quality of the Chinese pharmaceutical industry.

== Bioequivalence issues ==
While the FDA maintains that approved generic drugs are equivalent to their branded counterparts, bioequivalence problems have been reported by physicians and patients for many drugs. Certain classes of drugs are suspected to be particularly problematic because of their chemistry. Some of these include chiral drugs, poorly absorbed drugs, and cytotoxic drugs. In addition, complex delivery mechanisms can cause bioequivalence variances. Physicians are cautioned to avoid switching patients from branded to generic, or between different generic manufacturers, when prescribing anti-epileptic drugs, warfarin, and levothyroxine.

Major issues were raised in the verification of bioequivalence when multiple generic versions of FDA-approved generic drug were found not to be equivalent in efficacy and side effect profiles. In 2007, two providers of consumer information on nutritional products and supplements, ConsumerLab.com and The People's Pharmacy, released the results of comparative tests of different brands of bupropion. The People's Pharmacy received multiple reports of increased side effects and decreased efficacy of generic bupropion, which prompted it to ask ConsumerLab.com to test the products in question. The tests showed that some generic versions of Wellbutrin XL 300 mg did not perform the same as the brand-name pill in laboratory tests. The FDA investigated these complaints and concluded that the generic version is equivalent to Wellbutrin XL in regard to bioavailability of bupropion and its main active metabolite hydroxybupropion. The FDA also said that coincidental natural mood variation is the most likely explanation for the apparent worsening of depression after the switch from Wellbutrin XL to Budeprion XL. After several years of denying patient reports, in 2012 the FDA reversed this opinion, announcing that "Budeprion XL 300 mg fails to demonstrate therapeutic equivalence to Wellbutrin XL 300 mg." The FDA did not test the bioequivalence of any of the other generic versions of Wellbutrin XL 300 mg, but requested that the four manufacturers submit data on this question to the FDA by March 2013. As of October 2013, the FDA has made determinations on the formulations from some manufacturers not being bioequivalent.

In 2004, Ranbaxy was revealed to have been falsifying data regarding the generic drugs they were manufacturing. As a result, 30 products were removed from US markets and Ranbaxy paid $500 million in fines. The FDA investigated many Indian drug manufacturers after this was discovered, and as a result at least 12 companies have been banned from shipping drugs to the US.

In 2017, The European Medicines Agency recommended suspension of a number of nationally approved medicines for which bioequivalence studies were conducted by Micro Therapeutic Research Labs in India, due to inspections identifying misrepresentation of study data and deficiencies in documentation and data handling.

== See also ==
- Generic drug
- Pharmacokinetics
- Clinical trial
- Abbreviated New Drug Application
