= Absorption (pharmacology) =

Movement of a drug into the bloodstream or lymph

Absorption is the journey of a drug travelling from the site of administration to the site of action.

The drug travels by some route of administration (oral, topical-dermal, etc.) in a chosen dosage form (e.g., tablets, capsules, or in solution). Absorption by some other routes, such as intravenous therapy, intramuscular injection, enteral nutrition, is even more straightforward and there is less variability in absorption and bioavailability is often near 100%. Intravascular administration does not involve absorption, and there is no loss of drug. The fastest route of absorption is inhalation.

Absorption is a primary focus in drug development and medicinal chemistry, since a drug must be absorbed before any medicinal effects can occur. Moreover, the drug's pharmacokinetic profile can be easily and significantly changed by adjusting factors that affect absorption.

== Dissolution ==
Oral ingestion is the most common route of administration of pharmaceuticals. Passing through the esophagus to the stomach, the contents of the capsule or tablet are absorbed by the GI tract. The absorbed pharmaceutical is then passed through the liver and kidneys.

The rate of dissolution is a key target for controlling the duration of a drug's effect, and as such, several dosage forms that contain the same active ingredient may be available, differing only in the rate of dissolution. If a drug is supplied in a form that is not readily dissolved, it may be released gradually and act for longer. Having a longer duration of action may improve compliance since the medication will not have to be taken as often. Additionally, slow-release dosage forms may maintain concentrations within an acceptable therapeutic range over a longer period, whereas quick-release dosage forms may have sharper peaks and troughs in serum concentration.

The rate of dissolution is described by the Noyes–Whitney equation as shown below:

$$\frac{dW}{dt} = \frac{DA(C_{s}-C)}{L}$$

Where:

- $\frac{dW}{dt}$ is the rate of dissolution.
- A is the surface area of the solid.
- C is the concentration of the solid in the bulk dissolution medium.
- $C_{s}$ is the concentration of the solid in the diffusion layer surrounding the solid.
- D is the diffusion coefficient.
- L is the diffusion layer thickness.

As can be inferred from the Noyes–Whitney equation, the rate of dissolution may be modified primarily by altering the surface area of the solid by altering the particle size (e.g., with micronization). For many drugs, reducing the particle size reduces the dose needed to achieve the same therapeutic effect. The particle size reduction increases the specific surface area and the dissolution rate and does not affect solubility.

The rate of dissolution may also be altered by choosing a suitable polymorph of a compound. Different polymorphs have different solubility and dissolution rate characteristics. Specifically, crystalline forms dissolve slower than amorphous forms since they require more energy to leave the lattice during dissolution. The stablest crystalline polymorph has the lowest dissolution rate. Dissolution also differs between anhydrous and hydrous forms of a drug. Anhydrous forms often dissolve faster but sometimes are less soluble.

Esterification is also used to control solubility. For example, stearate and estolate esters of drugs have decreased solubility in gastric fluid. Later, esterases in the gastrointestinal tract (GIT) wall and blood hydrolyze these esters to release the parent drug.

Coatings on a tablet or pellet may act as barriers to reducing the dissolution rate. Coatings may also be used to control where dissolution takes place. For example, enteric coatings only dissolve in the basic environment of the intestines.

Drugs held in solution do not need to be dissolved before being absorbed.

Lipid-soluble drugs are absorbed more rapidly than water-soluble drugs.

== Ionization ==
The gastrointestinal tract is lined with epithelial cells. Drugs must pass through or permeate these cells to be absorbed into the bloodstream. Cell membranes may act as barriers to some drugs. They are essentially lipid bilayers which form semipermeable membranes. Pure lipid bilayers are generally permeable only to small, uncharged solutes. Hence, whether or not a molecule is ionized will affect its absorption, since ionic molecules are charged. Solubility favors charged species, and permeability favors neutral species. Some molecules have special exchange proteins and channels to facilitate movement from the lumen into the circulation.

Ions cannot passively diffuse through the gastrointestinal tract because the epithelial cell membrane is made up of a phospholipid bilayer, comprising two layers of phospholipids in which the charged hydrophilic heads face outwards and the uncharged hydrophobic fatty acid chains are in the middle of the layer. The fatty acid chains repel ionized, charged molecules. This means that the ionized molecules cannot pass through the intestinal membrane and be absorbed.

The Henderson-Hasselbalch equation offers a way to determine the proportion of a substance that is ionized at a given pH. In the stomach, drugs that are weak acids (such as aspirin) will be present mainly in their non-ionic form, and weak bases will be in their ionic form. Since non-ionic species diffuse more readily through cell membranes, weak acids will have a higher absorption in the highly acidic stomach.

However, the reverse is true in the basic environment of the intestines—weak bases (such as caffeine) will diffuse more readily since they will be non-ionic.

This aspect of absorption has been targeted by medicinal chemists. For example, they may choose an analog that is more likely to be in a non-ionic form. Also, the chemists may develop prodrugs of a compound—these chemical variants may be more readily absorbed and then metabolized by the body into the active compound. However, changing the structure of a molecule is less predictable than altering dissolution properties, since changes in chemical structure may affect the pharmacodynamic properties of a drug.

The solubility and permeability of a drug candidate are important physicochemical properties the scientist wants to know as early as possible.

== Other factors ==
Factors that affect absorption include:

- The way a drug product is designed and manufactured
- Its physical and chemical properties
- Other ingredients it contains
- The physiologic characteristics of the person taking the drug
- How the drug is stored

== Types ==
Types of absorption in pharmacokinetics include the following:

- Instantaneous absorption: absorption is nearly immediate. A common example is bolus intravenous injection.
- Zero-order absorption: rate of absorption is constant. A common example is continuous intravenous infusion.
- First-order absorption: rate of absorption is proportional to the amount of drug remaining to be absorbed. Representative examples include typical cases of oral administration, subcutaneous injection, and intramuscular injection.

== See also ==
- Gastrointestinal transit time
- Flip–flop kinetics
