= Hit to lead =

Stage of drug discovery

Hit to lead (H2L) also known as lead generation is a stage in early drug discovery where small molecule hits from a high throughput screen (HTS) are evaluated and undergo limited optimization to identify promising lead compounds. These lead compounds undergo more extensive optimization in a subsequent step of drug discovery called lead optimization (LO). The drug discovery process generally follows the following path that includes a hit to lead stage:

- Target validation (TV) → Assay development → High-throughput screening (HTS) → Hit to lead (H2L) → Lead optimization (LO) → Preclinical development → Clinical development

The hit to lead stage starts with confirmation and evaluation of the initial screening hits and is followed by synthesis of analogs (hit expansion). Typically the initial screening hits display binding affinities for their biological target in the micromolar (10^{−6} molar concentration) range. Through limited H2L optimization, the affinities of the hits are often improved by several orders of magnitude to the nanomolar (10^{−9} M) range. The hits also undergo limited optimization to improve metabolic half life so that the compounds can be tested in animal models of disease and also to improve selectivity against other biological targets binding that may result in undesirable side effects.

On average, only one in every 5,000 compounds that enters drug discovery to the stage of preclinical development becomes an approved drug.

== Hit confirmation ==
After hits are identified from a high throughput screen, the hits are confirmed and evaluated using the following methods:

- Confirmatory testing: compounds that were found active against the selected target are re-tested using the same assay conditions used during the HTS to make sure that the activity is reproducible.
- Dose response curve: the compound is tested over a range of concentrations to determine the concentration that results in half maximal binding or activity (IC_{50} or EC_{50} value respectively).
- Orthogonal testing: confirmed hits are assayed using a different assay which is usually closer to the target physiological condition or using a different technology.
- Secondary screening: confirmed hits are tested in a functional cellular assay to determine efficacy.
- Synthetic tractability: medicinal chemists evaluate compounds according to their synthesis feasibility and other parameters such as up-scaling or cost of goods.
- Biophysical testing: nuclear magnetic resonance (NMR), isothermal titration calorimetry (ITC), dynamic light scattering (DLS), surface plasmon resonance (SPR), dual polarisation interferometry (DPI), microscale thermophoresis (MST) are commonly used to assess whether the compound binds effectively to the target, the kinetics, thermodynamics, and stoichiometry of binding, any associated conformational change and to rule out promiscuous binding.
- Hit ranking and clustering: Confirmed hit compounds are then ranked according to the various hit confirmation experiments.
- Freedom to operate evaluation: hit structures are checked in specialized databases to determine if they are patentable.

== Hit expansion ==
Following hit confirmation, several compound clusters will be chosen according to their characteristics in the previously defined tests. An Ideal compound cluster will contain members that possess:

- high affinity towards the target (less than 1 μM)
- selectivity versus other targets
- significant efficacy in a cellular assay
- druglikeness (moderate molecular weight and lipophilicity usually estimated as ClogP). Affinity, molecular weight and lipophilicity can be linked in single parameter such as ligand efficiency and lipophilic efficiency.
- low to moderate binding to human serum albumin
- low interference with P450 enzymes and P-glycoproteins
- low cytotoxicity
- metabolic stability
- high cell membrane permeability
- sufficient water solubility (above 10 μM)
- chemical stability
- synthetic tractability
- patentability

The project team will usually select between three and six compound series to be further explored. The next step will allow the testing of analogous compounds to determine a quantitative structure-activity relationship (QSAR). Analogs can be quickly selected from an internal library or purchased from commercially available sources ("SAR by catalog" or "SAR by purchase"). Medicinal chemists will also start synthesizing related compounds using different methods such as combinatorial chemistry, high-throughput chemistry, or more classical organic chemistry synthesis.

== Lead optimization phase ==
The objective of this drug discovery phase is to synthesize lead compounds, new analogs with improved potency, reduced off-target activities, and physiochemical/metabolic properties suggestive of reasonable in vivo pharmacokinetics. This optimization is accomplished through chemical modification of the hit structure, with modifications chosen by employing knowledge of the structure–activity relationship (SAR) as well as structure-based design if structural information about the target is available.

Lead optimization is concerned with experimental testing and confirmation of the compound based on animal efficacy models and ADMET (in vitro and in situ) tools that may be followed by target identification and target validation.

== Best Practices for Hit Finding ==
For educational purposes the European Federation for Medicinal Chemistry and Chemical Biology (EFMC) shared a series of webinars including 'Best Practices for Hit Finding' as well as 'Hit Generation Case Studies'.

== See also ==
- Cheminformatics
- Drug design
- Drug development
- Drug metabolism
- Fragment-based lead discovery (FBLD)
- High-content screening (HCS)
- High-throughput screening (HTS)
- Pharmaceutical company
- Rational drug design
