= Fragment-based lead discovery =

Method used in drug discovery

Fragment-based lead discovery (FBLD) also known as fragment-based drug discovery (FBDD) is a method used for finding lead compounds as part of the drug discovery process. Fragments are small organic molecules which are small in size and low in molecular weight. It is based on identifying small chemical fragments, which may bind only weakly to the biological target, and then growing them or combining them to produce a lead with a higher affinity. FBLD can be compared with high-throughput screening (HTS). In HTS, libraries with up to millions of compounds, with molecular weights of around 500 Da, are screened, and nanomolar binding affinities are sought. In contrast, in the early phase of FBLD, libraries with a few thousand compounds with molecular weights of around 200 Da may be screened, and millimolar affinities can be considered useful. FBLD is a technique being used in research for discovering novel potent inhibitors. This methodology could help to design multitarget drugs for multiple diseases. The multitarget inhibitor approach is based on designing an inhibitor for the multiple targets. This type of drug design opens up new polypharmacological avenues for discovering innovative and effective therapies. Neurodegenerative diseases like Alzheimer's (AD) and Parkinson's, among others, also show rather complex etiopathologies. Multitarget inhibitors are more appropriate for addressing the complexity of AD and may provide new drugs for controlling the multifactorial nature of AD, stopping its progression.

== Library design ==
In analogy to the rule of five, it has been proposed that ideal fragments should follow the 'rule of three' (molecular weight < 300, ClogP < 3, the number of hydrogen bond donors and acceptors each should be < 3 and the number of rotatable bonds should be < 3). Since the fragments have relatively low affinity for their targets, they must have high water solubility so that they can be screened at higher concentrations.

== Library screening and quantification ==
In fragment-based drug discovery, the low binding affinities of the fragments pose significant challenges for screening. Many biophysical techniques have been applied to address this issue. In particular, ligand-observe nuclear magnetic resonance (NMR) methods such as water-ligand observed via gradient spectroscopy (waterLOGSY), saturation transfer difference spectroscopy (STD-NMR), ^{19}F NMR spectroscopy and inter-ligand Overhauser effect (ILOE) spectroscopy, protein-observe NMR methods such as ^{1}H-^{15}N heteronuclear single quantum coherence (HSQC) that utilises isotopically labelled proteins, surface plasmon resonance (SPR), isothermal titration calorimetry (ITC) and Microscale Thermophoresis (MST) are routinely-used for ligand screening and for the quantification of fragment binding affinity to the target protein. At modern X-ray crystallography synchrotron beamlines, several hundred data sets of protein-ligand complex crystal structures can be obtained within 24 hours. This technology makes crystallographic fragment screening possible, i.e. the use of X-ray crystallography directly for the fragment screening step.

Once a fragment (or a combination of fragments) have been identified, protein X-ray crystallography is used to obtain structural models of the protein-fragment(s) complexes. Such information can then be used to guide organic synthesis for high-affinity protein ligands and enzyme inhibitors.

== Ultra-Low-Molecular-Weight Fragments ==
Ultra-low-molecular-weight (ULMW) fragments, also known as MiniFrags, were introduced in 2019 as a complementary approach to conventional fragment-based drug discovery. Typically containing 5-7 heavy atoms and having a molecular weight of approximately 100 Da, these compounds are significantly smaller than conventional fragments. The rationale behind this approach is that conventional fragments, despite being smaller than compounds typically used in high-throughput screening, may fail to adequately probe small or spatially restricted regions of a protein surface. Their reduced molecular size allows ULMW fragments to investigate localised interaction sites with greater spatial resolution, potentially revealing binding hotspots that might otherwise remain undetected. This is particularly relevant for challenging targets, such as relatively flat protein-protein interaction interfaces and transient or sterically restricted binding pockets.

The original MiniFrag methodology employed highly soluble compounds screened through high-concentration aqueous soaking followed by X-ray crystallography. Nuclear magnetic resonance spectroscopy can also be employed for ULMW fragment screening, offering the possibility of detecting ligand-protein interactions in solution and characterising them at residue-level resolution. By identifying localised favourable interactions, ULMW fragments can provide structural information to guide molecular elaboration and lead optimisation. ULMW fragments are not intended to replace conventional fragment libraries, but rather to complement them. Their limited structural complexity and small number of potential intermolecular contacts make them less suitable as direct starting points for lead optimisation. Instead, their primary value lies in identifying favourable interaction regions at the protein surface, providing information that can guide the optimisation of larger fragments or the development of new chemical entities.

== Advantages over traditional libraries ==
Advantages of screening low molecular weight fragment based libraries over traditional higher molecular weight chemical libraries are several. These include:

- More hydrophilic hits in which hydrogen bonding is more likely to contribute to affinity (enthalpically driven binding). It is generally much easier to increase affinity by adding hydrophobic groups (entropically driven binding); starting with a hydrophilic ligand increases the chances that the final optimized ligand will not be too hydrophobic (log P < 5).
- Higher ligand efficiency so that the final optimized ligand will more likely be relatively low in molecular weight (MW < 500).
- Since two to three fragments in theory can be combined to form an optimized ligand, screening a fragment library of N compounds is equivalent to screening N^{2} - N^{3} compounds in a traditional library.
- Fragments are less likely to contain sterically blocking groups that interfere with an otherwise favorable ligand-protein interaction, increasing the combinatorial advantage of a fragment library even further.

== See also ==
- Druglikeness
- Protein-directed dynamic combinatorial chemistry
- Lipinski's rule of five
