= Discovery and development of triptans =

Development of a class of anti-migraine drugs

Triptans are a family of tryptamine-based drugs used as abortive medication in the treatment of migraines and cluster headaches. They are selective 5-hydroxytryptamine/serotonin_{1B/1D} (5-HT_{1B/1D}) agonists. Migraine is a complex disease which affects about 15% of the population and can be highly disabling. Triptans have advantages over ergotamine and dihydroergotamine, such as selective pharmacology, well established safety record and evidence-based prescribing instructions. Triptans are therefore often preferred treatment in migraine.

== History ==
Search for a new anti-migraine drug started at Glaxo in 1972. Studies in the 1960s showed that vasoconstriction from 5-HT, ergotamine and noradrenaline could reduce migraine attacks. Research also showed that platelet 5-HT level is reduced during migraine. Because there are too many side-effects for 5-HT to be used as a drug, scientists started research on the receptors of 5-HT in order to discover and develop a more specific agonist for 5-HT receptors. Research on the 5-HT receptors and their effect led to discovery of several types and subtypes of 5-HT. AH24167 showed a vasodilation effect instead of vasoconstriction due to the agonist effect on another type of 5-HT receptors later assigned the name 5-HT_{7}. AH25086 was the second compound developed and showed a vasoconstriction effect but was not released as a drug due to low per oral bioavailability. Continued research led to the discovery of the first triptan drug, sumatriptan, that had both vasoconstriction effect, as well as better oral bioavailability. Sumatriptan was first launched in the Netherlands in 1991 and became available in the United States during 1993.

== Mechanism ==
Triptans are specific and selective agonists for the 5-HT_{1} receptors. Sumatriptan binds to 5-HT_{1D} receptors, zolmitriptan, rizatriptan, naratriptan, almotriptan, and frovatriptan binds to 5-HT_{1B/1D} and eletriptan binds to 5-HT_{1B/1D/1F} receptors. Triptans are believed to exert their effects through vasoconstriction, leading to reduced carotid arterial circulation without affecting cerebral blood flow, peripheral neuronal inhibition, or inhibition of transmission through second order neurons of the trigeminocervical complex.

== Receptors ==
5-HT receptors are all G-protein coupled receptors (GPCR) except for 5-HT_{3} which is a ligand gated ion channel. The receptors that have been found to be involved in migraine are 5-HT_{1B}, 5-HT_{1D} and 5-HT_{1F} receptors. 5-HT_{1B} are found in meningeal arteries, agonism of 5-HT_{1B} causes vasoconstriction in cranial nerves. The 5-HT_{1D} receptors are located primarily in the trigeminal nerve in the central nervous system (CNS). They are also found in vascular smooth muscles, mediating contraction. Agonism of 5-HT_{1D} receptors subdues the release of inflammatory mediators. It has been shown that both 5-HT_{1B} and 5-HT_{1D} receptors in humans have a very similar amino acid structures, from which the similarities in binding properties can be expected.

== Design ==
All triptans have an indole structure identical to the neurotransmitter 5-HT. Classic triptan structure contain side chain on the indole ring, and a basic nitrogen in a similar distance from the indole structure. The main structural difference of the triptans is the position of the sulfonamide and the side chain attached to it (see figure 1 and table 1). Rizatriptan and zolmitriptan have instead of a sulfonamide a triazole and 2-oxazolidone respectively. Another exception to the classic structure is seen on eletriptan where the nitrogen-alkyl chain connected to the indole ring is replaced with a dimethyl-pyrrolidine, and in naratriptan where the nitrogen-alkyl chain is replaced with a 1-methyl-piperidine ring.

One of the frovatriptan side chains forms an additional ring with the indole, resulting in a carbazole ring system.

=== Structures of the triptans ===
Fig 1. Indole structure of triptans

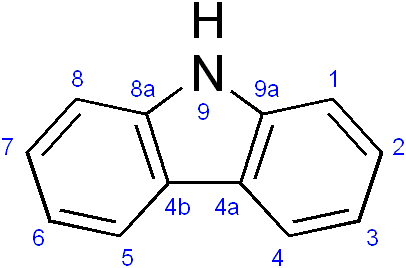
Fig 1a. Carbazole structure of frovatriptan

Table 1. Side groups of triptans
Triptan	R_{1}	R_{2}	Triptan	R_{1}	R_{2}
Sumatriptan			Eletriptan		
Rizatriptan			Naratriptan		
Almotriptan			Frovatriptan		
Zolmitriptan			–	–	–

=== The 5-HT_{1B/D} pharmacophore ===
Fig 2. Pharmacophore model for the triptans.

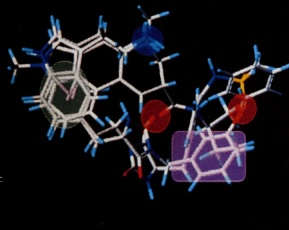
Fig 3. Shows how different ligands fit to the pharmacophore.

5-HT_{1B} and 5-HT_{1D} receptors are considered very similar, they share amino acid homology and their ligands expose similar binding properties thus they have similar pharmacophore. The pharmacophore model for these receptors ligands is qualitative and defines the relative positions of important groups. It is defined with following five main features: an aromatic group (usually the indole), protonated amine (a donor of hydrogen bond), acceptor of hydrogen bond, additional hydrogen bond site (both donor and acceptor) and hydrophobic region located between both hydrogen bond sites, see figure 2. The main binding points were concluded to be the protonated amine and the hydrogen bond site. It was observed that the double bond region in the indole was necessary for the agonism in this series of compounds. Figure 3 shows how different drugs fit the pharmacophore, with a C and N linked analogues of 5-HT_{1D} agonist. The marked sites on the figure are responsible for the affinity. The pharmacophore can be characterized as amphipathic, that means that the structure has both hydrophobic and hydrophilic groups.

=== Relevant structural features of triptans and binding to the receptor ===
Triptan structures were designed from the structure of 5-HT to attain affinity to 5-HT receptors, hence the identical indole structure. The hydroxyl group (-OH) on the hexane of the indole core and the alkyl-amine side chain on position C_{3} on 5-HT have been replaced with other compounds, such as sulfonamides or azol-ring structured derivatives and different amine-alkyl side chains. An electro-negative group can form a hydrogen bond with Thr in the pocket of the receptor. Sulfonamide derivatives attached to the hexane ring of the indole structure have electro-negative properties, as well as the triazole and 2-oxazolidone on rizatriptan and zolmitriptan respectively. This can increase binding ability of the compound and the efficacy, especially with the 5-HT_{1D} receptor.

Fig 4. Schematic picture of sumatriptan binding to 5-HT_{1D} receptor

A schematic drawing of the binding of sumatriptan to 5-HT_{1D} receptor can be seen in figure 4. One study showed that sumatriptan fits better in the binding site of the receptor when the side chain with the protonated nitrogen atom is folded back over the indole structure. This alignment contributes to the hydrogen bonding between the nitrogen in the sulfonamide and the Ser138 in the binding site. It is also favorable to the formation of the hydrogen bond between the oxygen of the sulfonamide and Thr202. Other binding in the pocket of the binding site occurs with the nitrogen atom in the pentene ring of the indole structure of the triptan and the amino acid Ser352. This energetically favorable position of the agonist makes it possible for additional binding of the ligand to other Ser in the binding site, along with additional anchoring between Phe in the pocket of the binding site and the indole of the agonist. The binding of Phe and the triptan is caused by π stacking interactions of the indole and amino acid and an additional effect on this interaction is because of dispersive effect of amino acid leucine (Leu; not shown in figure 4). The amino acids Trp343 and Tyr346 both have electron rich π-systems in their aromatic structures. With their position in the binding site they create a sort of aromatic cage around the protonated nitrogen atom of the side chain on position C_{3} on the triptans (this nitrogen atom is protonated at physiological condition), and thereby stabilizes the ion bond the nitrogen atom has formed with a carboxylate on aspartic acid. Side chains of the surrounding amino acids can have an effect on the binding of the nitrogen atom, mainly three Phe can affect the methyl groups bound to the nitrogen atom (not shown in figure 4).

Eletriptan has higher affinity for the receptor, which is probably a result of the bulky substituents of the structure. The amine is protonated at physiological pH condition, triggering better uptake. The uptake rate of the agonist is different depending on whether the amine in R_{2} is primary, secondary or tertiary but the latter seem to give the best results. For the R_{1} substituent an electron rich sulfonamide groups and amide group has shown the best results in receptor binding and activity. It has been observed that a relationship is between absorption and molecular size hence larger hydrophilic molecules tended to have poor absorption. A small R_{1} substituent is necessary to maintain the rapid oral bioavailability of triptans.

By placing an electron-withdrawing group or large group on position C_{2} on the indole structure the 5-HT agonist is conversed into an antagonist. This is thought to be because the indole ring is unable to occupy the aromatic part of the binding site.

== Triptan drugs ==
=== Properties of formulations ===
Sumatriptan was the pioneer drug in this class. The second generation's triptans such as zolmitriptan, naratriptan, rizatriptan, almotriptan, eletriptan and frovatriptan soon became available. Different triptans are available in different formulations and in different strengths (see table 2). They have been formulated as subcutaneous injections, oral tablets, orally disintegrating tablets, nasal spray and as rectal suppositories. Delivery system of the triptans may play an important role in the onset of action. The selection of anti-migraine drug for patients depends on their symptoms. The first selective 5-HT_{1B/1D} agonist, sumatriptan, was first synthesized as a subcutaneous injection, then as an oral tablets and more recently as a nasal spray, it is also available in some countries as suppositories. The subcutaneous injection is the fastest way to stop a rapidly progressing migraine attack. The sumatriptan nasal spray provides faster onset of action than the tablets but it produces a similar headache response at 2 hours. Some patients prefer the nasal spray as it works more rapidly than the tablets and does not have as many adverse effects as the subcutaneous injection. Nasal spray is although not suitable for all patients, because some patients experience bad taste and lack of consistency of response. Zolmitriptan was developed with the strategy to create a more lipophilic compound, with faster absorption and better ability to cross the blood brain barrier than sumatriptan. It is available as tablets, orally disintegrating tablets and as nasal spray in some countries. Rizatriptan is available as tablets and orally disintegrating tablets but naratriptan, almotriptan, eletriptan and frovatriptan are only available in tablets, for now.

Table 2: Properties of triptan formulations
Generic	Formulations	Doses (mg)	Maximum daily dose (mg)	Onset of action (min)	Duration of action	Affinity (pKI in nM)	Metabolism	Excretion
Sumatriptan	Tablets; Nasal spray Subcutaneous injection Suppositories	25, 50, 100; 5, 20; 6; 25	200; 40; 12; 50	30–60; 15–30; 10–15; 30–60	Short	7.9–8.5	MAO-A	Urine (57%), Feces (38%)
Zolmitriptan	Tablets; Orally disintegrating tablets Nasal spray	2.5, 5; 2.5, 5; 2.5, 5	10; 10; 10	45 – 10–15	Short	9.2	CYP1A2; MAO-A	Urine (65%), Feces (30%)
Naratriptan	Tablets	1, 2.5	5	60–180	Long	8.3	CYP^{a} Renal; MAO-A	Urine
Rizatriptan	Tablets; Orally disintegrating tablets	5, 10; 5, 10	30; 30	30–120 –	Short	7.7	MAO-A	Urine
Almotriptan	Tablets	6.25, 12.5	25	60–180	Short	7.8	MAO-A; CYP2D6; CYP3A4	Urine (40%), Feces (13%)
Eletriptan	Tablets	20, 40	80	<60	–	8.9	CYP3A4	–
Frovatriptan	Tablets	2.5	7.5	60–120	Long	8.4	CYP1A2	Urine (40%)

^{a} Specific enzyme not yet reported.

The U.S. Food and Drug Administration (FDA) approved a new drug April 15, 2008, which is a combination of sumatriptan 85 mg and naproxen 500 mg (NSAID). Triptans and NSAIDs work on distinct mechanism involved in migraine and therefore may offer improved treatment when administrated together.

=== Pharmacokinetics ===
Pharmacokinetic properties (see table 3) are important when new drugs are developed.

Patients seek rapid onset of action to relief the headache. Relatively short t_{max}, good bioavailability and lipophilicity are pharmacokinetic properties that have been associated with rapid onset of action. It has been speculated that good ability to cross the blood brain barrier and relatively long terminal elimination half-life may result in a lower incidence of headache recurrence. Sumatriptan and rizatriptan undergo first pass hepatic metabolism and result in lower bioavailability.

Table 3: Pharmacokinetic properties of triptans in tablet formulation
Generic	Bioavailability (%)	Lipophilicity	Protein binding (%)	t_{1/2} (h)	t_{max} (h)	Cl_{R} (mL min-1)	Log D_{pH7.4}	V_{D}
Sumatriptan	14	Low	10–21	2–2.5	2–2.5	260	-1.5	2.4–3.3 L/kg
Zolmitriptan	40	Moderate	25	3	2	193	-1.0	7.0 L/kg
Naratriptan	63(M) / 74(F)	High	28–31	5–6	2–3	220	-0.2	2.4 L/kg
Rizatriptan	47	Moderate	14	2–2.5	1.3	414	-0.7	140(M) / 110(F) L
Almotriptan	69	–	35	3.6	1.4–3.8	–	-2.1	180–200 L
Eletriptan	50	High	85	4–5	1–2	597	0.5	138 L
Frovatriptan	24(M) / 30(F)	Low	20–30	25	2–4	216(M) / 132(F)	-1.0	4.2(M) / 3.0(F) L/kg

t_{1/2} = Elimination half-life; t_{max} = Time to reach peak plasma drug concentration; Cl_{R} = Renal Clearance; LogD_{pH7.4} = Measure of lipophilicity at pH 7.4. Increasing number indicate greater solubility; V_{D} = Volume of distribution
M = Male; F = Female

== Future research ==
Most triptans were developed and introduced in the 1990s. Further studies have not shown much promise regarding the development of new triptans with better duration of action, efficacy and safety profile. Therefore, it is unlikely that further variations will be developed and new anti-migraine drugs are likely to have another mechanism of action.
