= 3-Methyl-19-methyleneandrosta-3,5-dien-17β-ol =

Chemical compound

Clinical data
- Other names: 3-Methyl-19-methyleneandrosta-3,5-dien-17β-ol

Identifiers
- IUPAC name: (8R,9S,10S,13S,14S,17S)-10-Ethenyl-3,13-dimethyl-2,7,8,9,11,12,14,15,16,17-decahydro-1H-cyclopenta[a]phenanthren-17-ol
- CAS Number: 871840-07-2
- PubChem CID: 24896626
- ChemSpider: 23306322
- ChEMBL: ChEMBL398456
- CompTox Dashboard (EPA): DTXSID201250844

Chemical and physical data
- Formula: C_{21}H_{30}O
- Molar mass: 298.470 g·mol^{−1}
- 3D model (JSmol): Interactive image
- SMILES: CC1=CC2=CC[C@H]3[C@@H]4CC[C@@H]([C@]4(CC[C@@H]3[C@]2(CC1)C=C)C)O
- InChI: InChI=1S/C21H30O/c1-4-21-12-9-14(2)13-15(21)5-6-16-17-7-8-19(22)20(17,3)11-10-18(16)21/h4-5,13,16-19,22H,1,6-12H2,2-3H3/t16-,17-,18-,19-,20-,21-/m0/s1; Key:PPGVWCDLIZEUNC-PXQJOHHUSA-N

3-Methyl-19-methyleneandrosta-3,5-dien-17β-ol is a synthetic, steroidal estrogen and a selective agonist of the ERβ. It was discovered serendipitously and was the lead compound among a series of androsta-3,5-dienes as ERβ ligands. Its affinity (IC_{50}) for the ERβ was found to be 9 nM and it showed 62- and 160-fold binding selectivity for this receptor over the AR and the ERα, respectively. The EC_{50} of the compound for the ERβ was found to be 69 nM and its intrinsic activity was 92% (relative to that of estradiol). As such, it is a potent ERβ agonist with high affinity and selectivity.
