= Dynamic combinatorial chemistry =

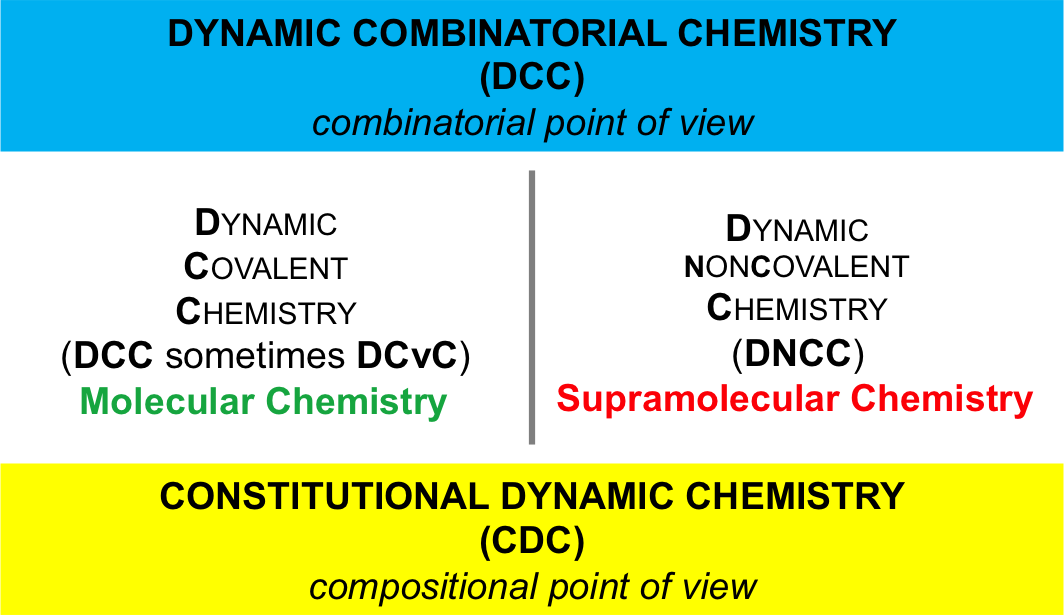
The terminology used in the field of Dynamic Combinatorial Chemistry (DCC) and Constitutional Dynamic Chemistry (CDC).

Dynamic combinatorial chemistry (DCC); also known as constitutional dynamic chemistry (CDC) is a method for the generation of new molecules formed by reversible reaction of simple building blocks under thermodynamic control. The library of these reversibly interconverting building blocks is called a dynamic combinatorial library (DCL). All constituents in a DCL are in equilibrium, and their distribution is determined by their thermodynamic stability within the DCL. The interconversion of these building blocks may involve covalent or non-covalent interactions. When a DCL is exposed to an external influence (such as proteins or nucleic acids), the equilibrium shifts and those components that interact with the external influence are stabilised and amplified, allowing more of the active compound to be formed.

== History ==
An early example of dynamic combinatorial chemistry in organic synthesis. Sanders et al. employed DCC to generate steroid-derived macrocycles, capable of interconversion by transesterification.

By modern definition, dynamic combinatorial chemistry is generally considered to be a method of facilitating the generation of new chemical species by the reversible linkage of simple building blocks, under thermodynamic control. This principle is known to select the most thermodynamically stable product from an equilibrating mixture of a number of components, a concept commonly utilised in synthetic chemistry to direct the control of reaction selectivity. Although this approach was arguably utilised in the work of Fischer and Werner as early as the 19th century, their respective studies of carbohydrate and coordination chemistry were restricted to rudimentary speculation, requiring the rationale of modern thermodynamics. It was not until supramolecular chemistry revealed early concepts of molecular recognition, complementarity and self-organisation that chemists could begin to employ strategies for the rational design and synthesis of macromolecular targets. The concept of template synthesis was further developed and rationalised through the pioneering work of Busch in the 1960s, which clearly defined the role of a metal ion template in stabilising the desired ‘thermodynamic’ product, allowing for its isolation from the complex equilibrating mixture. Although the work of Busch helped to establish the template method as a powerful synthetic route to stable macrocyclic structures, this approach remained exclusively within the domain of inorganic chemistry until the early 1990s, when Sanders et al. first proposed the concept of dynamic combinatorial chemistry. Their work combined thermodynamic templation in tandem with combinatorial chemistry, to generate a mixture complex porphyrin and imine macrocycles using a modest selection of simple building blocks.

Sanders then developed this early manifestation of dynamic combinatorial chemistry as a strategy for organic synthesis; the first example being the thermodynamically-controlled macrolactonisation of oligocholates to assemble cyclic steroid-derived macrocycles capable of interconversion via component exchange. Early work by Sanders et al. employed transesterification to generate dynamic combinatorial libraries. In retrospect, it was unfortunate that esters were selected for mediating component exchange, as transesterification processes are inherently slow and require vigorous anhydrous conditions. However, their subsequent investigations identified that both the disulfide and hydrazone covalent bonds exhibit effective component exchange processes and so present a reliable means of generating dynamic combinatorial libraries capable of thermodynamic templation. This chemistry now forms the basis of much research in the developing field of dynamic covalent chemistry, and has in recent years emerged as a powerful tool for the discovery of molecular receptors.

== Protein-directed ==
One of the key developments within the field of DCC is the use of proteins (or other biological macromolecules, such as nucleic acids) to influence the evolution and generation of components within a DCL. Protein-directed DCC provides a way to generate, identify and rank novel protein ligands, and therefore have huge potential in the areas of enzyme inhibition and drug discovery.

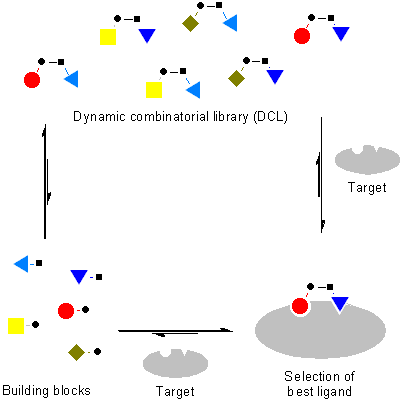
Scheme illustrating the theory of protein-directed dynamic combinatorial chemistry (DCC).

=== Reversible covalent reactions ===
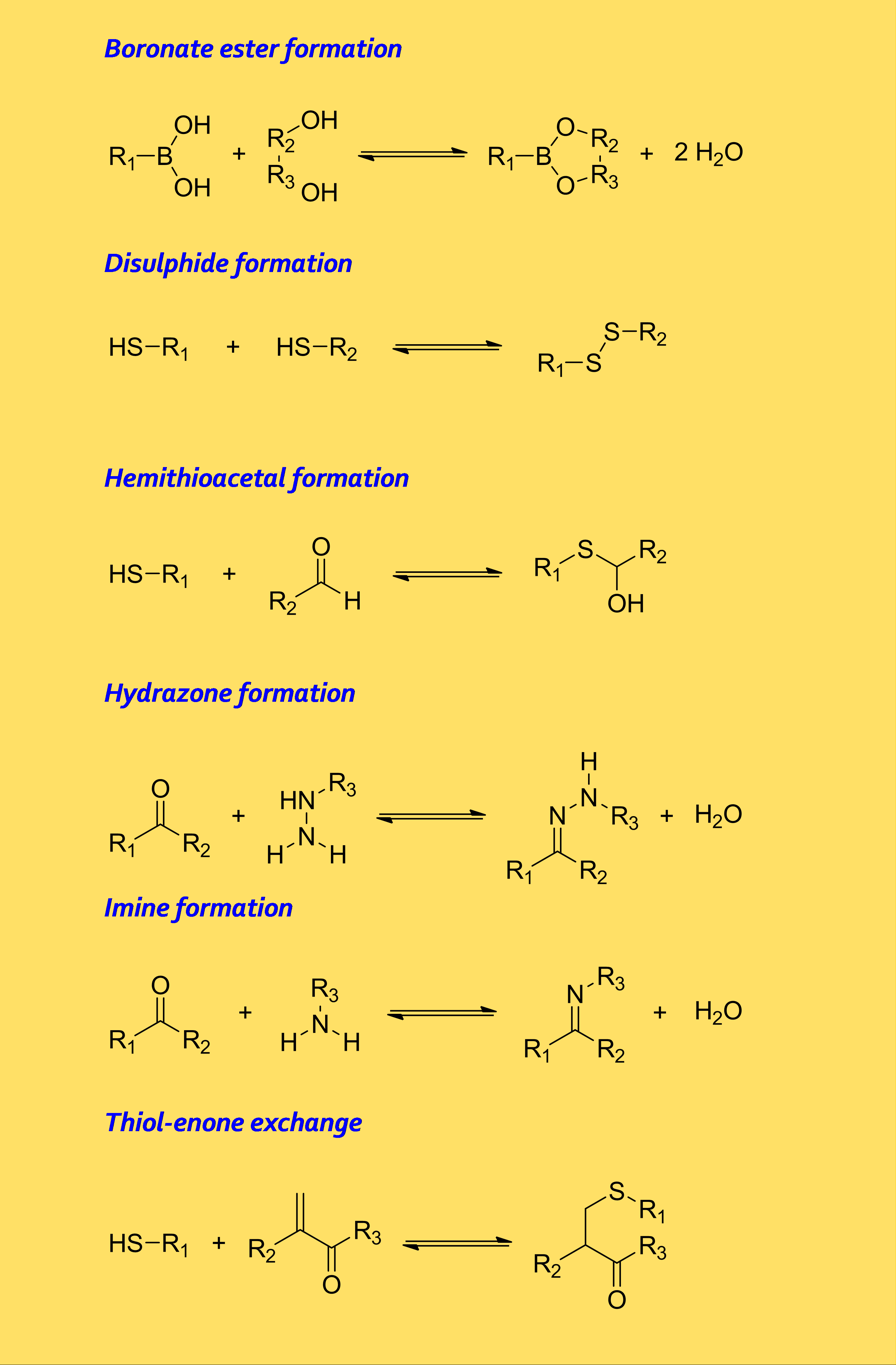
Types of reversible covalent reactions that have been applied in protein-directed dynamic combinatorial chemistry (DCC).

The development of Protein-directed DCC has not been straightforward because the reversible reactions employed must occur in aqueous solution at biological pH and temperature, and the components of the DCL must be compatible with proteins.

Several reversible reactions have been proposed and/or applied in Protein-directed DCC. These included boronate ester formation, diselenides-disulfides exchange, disulphide formation, hemithiolacetal formation, hydrazone formation, imine formation and thiol-enone exchange.

=== Pre-equilibrated DCL ===
For reversible reactions that do not occur in aqueous buffers, the pre-equilibrated DCC approach can be used. The DCL was initially generated (or pre-equilibrated) in organic solvent, and then diluted into aqueous buffer containing the protein target for selection. Organic based reversible reactions, including Diels-Alder and alkene cross metathesis reactions, have been proposed or applied to Protein-directed DCC using this method.

=== Reversible non-covalent reactions ===
Reversible non-covalent reactions, such as metal-ligand coordination, has also been applied in Protein-directed DCC. This strategy is useful for the investigation of the optimal ligand stereochemistry at the binding site of the target protein.

=== Enzyme-catalysed reversible reactions ===
Enzyme-catalysed reversible reactions, such as protease-catalysed amide bond formation/hydrolysis reactions and the aldolase-catalysed aldol reactions, have also been applied to Protein-directed DCC.

=== Analytical methods ===
Protein-directed DCC system must be amenable to efficient screening. Several analytical techniques have been applied to the analysis of Protein-directed DCL. These include HPLC, mass spectrometry, NMR spectroscopy, and X-ray crystallography.

=== Multi-protein approach ===
Although most applications of Protein-directed DCC to date involved the use of single protein in the DCL, it is possible to identify protein ligands by using multiple proteins simultaneously, as long as a suitable analytical technique is available to detect the protein species that interact with the DCL components. This approach may be used to identify specific inhibitors or broad-spectrum enzyme inhibitors.

== Other applications ==
DCC is useful in identifying molecules with unusual binding properties, and provides synthetic routes to complex molecules that aren't easily accessible by other means. These include smart materials, foldamers, self-assembling molecules with interlocking architectures and new soft materials. The application of DCC to detect volatile bioactive compounds, i.e. the amplification and sensing of scent, was proposed in a concept paper. Recently, DCC was also used to study the abiotic origins of life.

== See also ==
- Combinatorial biology
- Combinatorial chemistry
- Drug discovery
- Fragment-based lead discovery
- High-throughput screening
