= Lipophilic efficiency =

Parameter used in drug design

Lipophilic efficiency (LiPE), sometimes referred to as ligand-lipophilicity efficiency (LLE) is a parameter used in drug design and drug discovery to evaluate the quality of research compounds, linking potency and lipophilicity in an attempt to estimate druglikeness. For a given compound LiPE is defined as the pIC_{50} (or pEC_{50}) of interest minus the LogP of the compound.

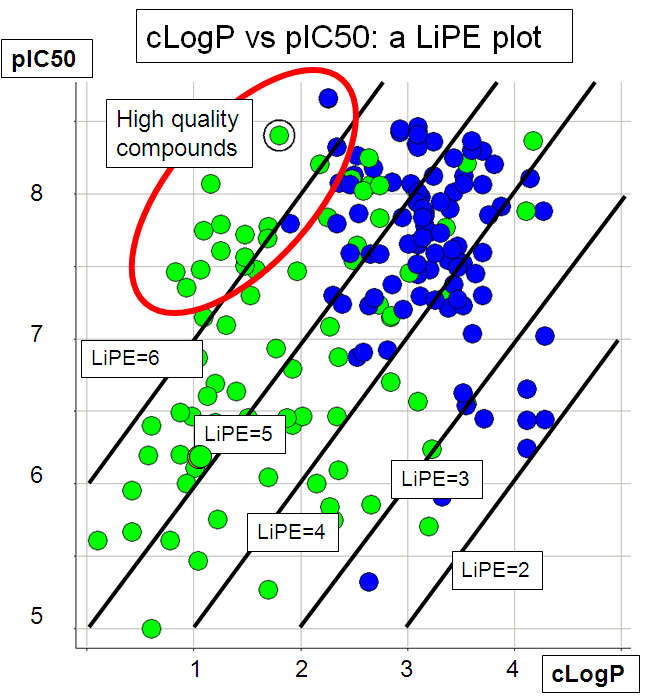
A plot of LogP vs pIC_{50} for 2 series of compounds (series 1: green dots, series 2: blue dots). Diagonal lines represents areas of equal LiPE. Analysis of this LiPE plot shows that series 1 includes many compounds with a high LiPE, and thus may represent a better lead series for further optimization.

$$\ce{LiPE} = \ce{pIC50} - \log P$$

In practice, calculated values such as cLogP or calculated LogD are often used instead of the measured LogP or LogD. LiPE is used to compare compounds of different potencies (pIC_{50}s) and lipophilicities (LogP). High potency (high value of pIC_{50}) is a desirable attribute in drug candidates, as it reduces the risk of non-specific, off-target pharmacology at a given concentration. When associated with low clearance, high potency also allows for low total dose, which lowers the risk of idiosyncratic drug reaction.

On the other hand, LogP is an estimate of a compound's overall lipophilicity, a value that influence its behavior in a range of biological processes relevant to a drug discovery, such as solubility, permeability through biological membranes, hepatic clearance, lack of selectivity and non-specific toxicity. For oral drugs, a LogP value comprised between 2 and 3 is often considered optimal to achieve a compromise between permeability and first-pass clearance.

LiPE allows capturing both values in a single parameter, and empirical evidence suggest that quality drug candidates have a high LiPE (>6); this value corresponds to a compound with a pIC_{50} of 8 and a LogP of 2. Plotting LogP against pIC_{50} for a range of compounds allows ranking series and individual compounds.

An alternative equation uses the logarithm of the ratio of potency (measured as binding energy) and the partition coefficient to compute a lipophilic ligand efficiency index (LE) with a different scale.

$$\ce{LElipo} = \log\left(\frac{-\Delta G}{P}\right)$$

The following review discusses LipE in the context of other compound efficiency metrics.
