= Druglikeness =

Concept in drug design

Druglikeness is a qualitative concept used in drug design for how "druglike" a substance is with respect to factors such as bioavailability.

== Properties of druglike molecules ==
A druglike molecule has properties such as:

- Solubility in both water and fat, as an orally administered drug needs to pass through the intestinal lining after it is consumed, be carried in aqueous blood and penetrate the lipid-based cell membrane to reach the inside of a cell. A model compound for the lipophilic cellular membrane is 1-octanol (a lipophilic medium-chain fatty alcohol), so the logarithm of the octanol-water partition coefficient, known as LogP, is used to predict the solubility of a potential oral drug. This coefficient can be experimentally measured or predicted computationally, in which case it is sometimes called "cLogP". As the lipophilicity of ionizable compounds is strongly dependent of pH, the distribution coefficient logD, or a logP vs pH curve may be used instead.
- Potency at the biological target. High potency (e.g. high value of pIC_{50}) is a desirable attribute in drug candidates, as it reduces the risk of non-specific, off-target pharmacology at a given concentration. When associated with low clearance, high potency also allows for low total dose, which lowers the risk of idiosyncratic drug reactions.
- Ligand efficiency and lipophilic efficiency.
- Molecular weight: The great majority of drugs on the market have molecular weights between 200 and 600 daltons, and particularly if they belong to the group of small molecules.

== Evaluation ==
A traditional method to evaluate druglikeness is to check compliance of Lipinski's Rule of Five, which covers the numbers of hydrophilic groups, molecular weight and hydrophobicity.

Since the drug is transported in aqueous media like blood and intracellular fluid, it has to be sufficiently water-soluble in the absolute sense (i.e. must have a minimum chemical solubility in order to be effective). Solubility in water can be estimated from the number of hydrogen bond donors/acceptors vs. carbon atoms in the molecule. Low water solubility translates to slow absorption and action. Too many hydrogen bond donors, on the other hand, lead to low fat solubility, so that the drug cannot penetrate the cell membrane to reach the inside of the cell.

Based on one definition, a drug-like molecule has a logarithm of partition coefficient (log P) between −0.4 and 5.6, molecular weight 160–480 g/mol, molar refractivity of 40–130, which is related to the volume and molecular weight of the molecule and has 20–70 atoms.

== Factors ==
Substructures with known toxic, mutagenic or teratogenic properties affect the usefulness of a designed molecule. However, several poisons have a good druglikeness. Natural toxins are used in pharmacological research to find out their mechanism of action, and if it could be exploited for beneficial purposes. Alkylnitro compounds tend to be irritants, and Michael acceptors, such as enones, are alkylating agents and thus potentially mutagenic and carcinogenic.

== Indices and alternatives ==
Druglikeness indices are inherently limited tools. Druglikeness can be estimated for any molecule, and does not evaluate the actual specific effect that the drug achieves (biological activity). Simple rules are not always accurate and may unnecessarily limit the chemical space to search: many best-selling drugs have features that cause them to score low on various druglikeness indices. Furthermore, first-pass metabolism, which is biochemically selective, can destroy the pharmacological activity of a compound despite good druglikeness.

An alternative way to estimate druglikeness is a quantitated estimate of druglikeness (QED) score, which can be calculated for molecular structures. This score compresses factors in physicochemical properties calculated for a compound (including those found in Lipinski's Rule of Five), into a single, unitless score ranging from 0 (all properties unfavourable for drug candidacy) to 1 (all properties favorable), with a threshold range between the two categories in the 0.5 to 0.6 range. The advantage of this approach over rules-based methods lies in its ability to identify cases when a generally unfavourable property can be tolerated where the other parameters are close to ideal.

== Biologics ==
Druglikeness is not relevant for most biologics, since they are usually proteins that need to be injected, because proteins are digested if eaten.

== See also ==
- Lipinski's rule of five (RO5)
- Fragment-based lead discovery (FBLD)
- Druggability
