= Ligand efficiency =

Measure of a ligand's binding energy per atom

Ligand efficiency is a measurement of the binding energy per atom of a ligand to its binding partner, such as a receptor or enzyme.

Ligand efficiency is used in drug discovery research programs to assist in narrowing focus to lead compounds with optimal combinations of physicochemical properties and pharmacological properties.

Mathematically, ligand efficiency (LE) can be defined as the ratio of Gibbs free energy (ΔG) to the number of non-hydrogen atoms of the compound:

LE = -(ΔG)/N

where ΔG = −RTlnK_{i} and N is the number of non-hydrogen atoms. It can be transformed to the equation:

LE = 1.4(−log IC_{50})/N

== Other metrics ==
Some suggest that better metrics for ligand efficiency are percentage/potency efficiency index (PEI), binding efficiency index (BEI) and surface-binding efficiency index (SEI) because they are easier to calculate and take into account the differences between elements in different rows of the periodic table. PEI is a relative measure for comparing compounds tested in the same conditions (e.g. a single-point assay) and are not comparable at different inhibitor concentrations. Also for BEI and SEI, similar measurements must be used (e.g. always using pK_{i}).

PEI = (% inhibition at a given compound concentration as fraction: 0 – 1.0) / (molecular weight, kDa)
BEI = (pK_{i}, pK_{d}, or pIC_{50}) / (molecular weight, kDa)
SEI = (pK_{i}, pK_{d}, or pIC_{50}) / (PSA/100 Å)

where pK_{i}, pK_{d} and pIC_{50} is defined as −log(K_{i}), −log(K_{d}), or −log(IC _{50}), respectively. K_{i} and IC_{50} in mol/L.

The authors suggest plotting compounds SEI and BEI on a plane and optimizing compounds towards the diagonal and so optimizing both SEI and BEI which incorporate potency, molecular weight and PSA.

There are other metrics which can be useful during hit to lead optimization: group efficiency (GE), lipophilic efficiency/lipophilic ligand efficiency (LipE/LLE), ligand lipophilicity index (LLE_{AT}) ligand efficiency dependent lipophilicity (LELP), fit quality scaled ligand efficiency (LE_{scale}), size independent ligand efficiency (SILE).

Group efficiency (GE) is a metric used to estimate the binding efficiency of groups added to a ligand. Unlike ligand efficiency which evaluates the efficiency of the entire molecule, group efficiency measures the relative change of the Gibbs free energy (ΔΔG), caused by addition or modification of groups, normalized by the change in the number heavy atoms in those groups (ΔN), using the equation:

GE = -(ΔΔG)/ΔN

== See also ==
- Drug design
- Drug discovery hit to lead
