= First pass effect =

Phenomenon of drug metabolism

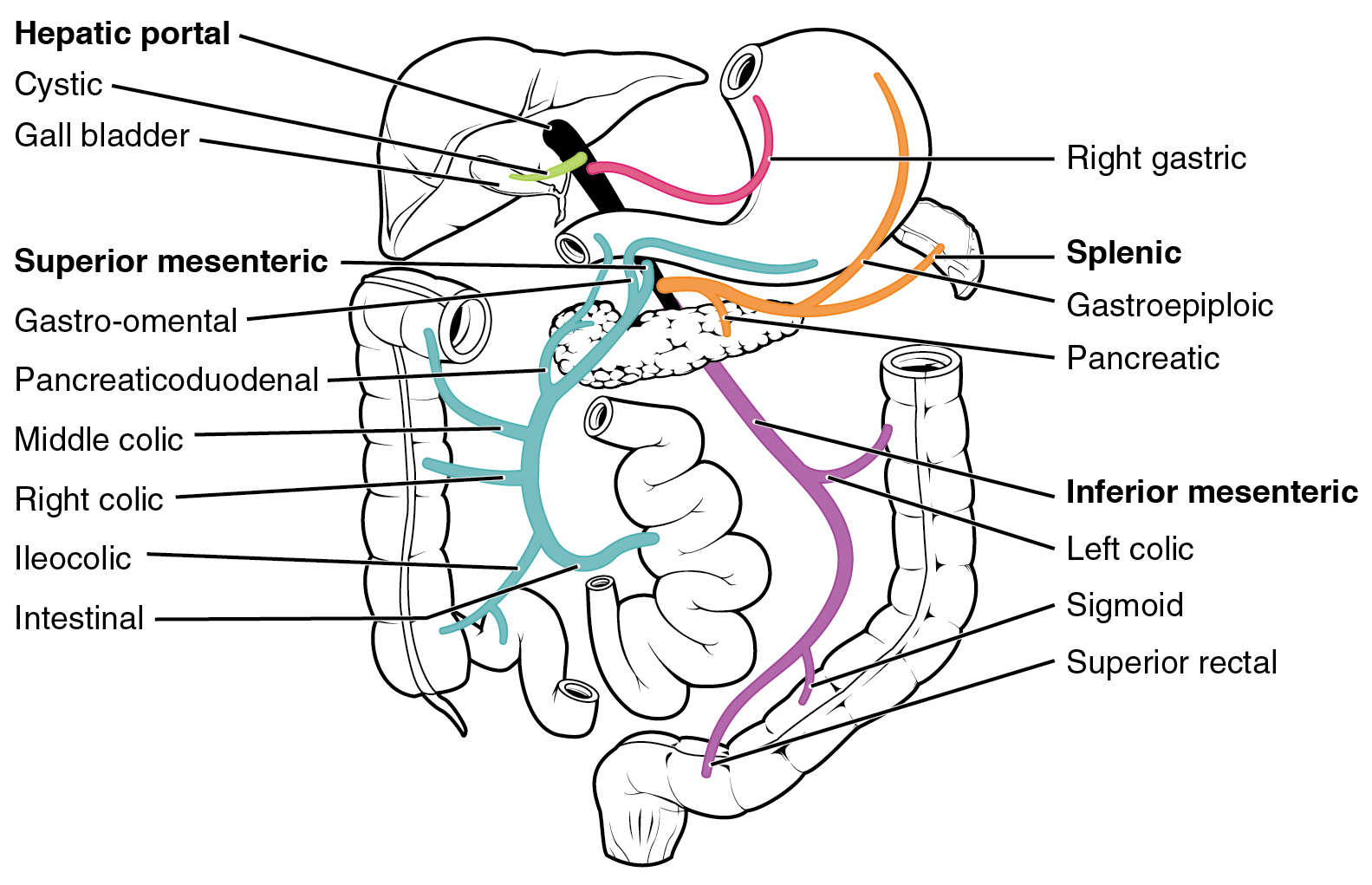
Illustration showing the hepatic portal vein system

The first pass effect (FPE), also known as first-pass metabolism (FPM) or presystemic metabolism, is a phenomenon of drug metabolism at a specific location in the body which leads to a reduction in the concentration of the active drug before it reaches the site of action or systemic circulation. The effect is most associated with orally administered medications, but some drugs still undergo first-pass metabolism even when delivered via an alternate route (e.g., IV, IM, etc.). During this metabolism, drug is lost during the process of absorption which is generally related to the liver and gut wall. The liver is the major site of first pass effect; however, it can also occur in the lungs, vasculature or other metabolically active tissues in the body.

Notable drugs that experience a significant first pass effect are buprenorphine, chlorpromazine, cimetidine, diazepam, ethanol (drinking alcohol), imipramine, insulin, lidocaine, midazolam, morphine, pethidine, propranolol, and tetrahydrocannabinol (THC).

First-pass metabolism is not to be confused with phase I metabolism, which is a separate process.

== Factors ==
First-pass metabolism may occur in the liver (for propranolol, lidocaine, clomethiazole, and nitroglycerin) or in the gut (for benzylpenicillin and insulin). The four primary systems that affect the first pass effect of a drug are the enzymes of the gastrointestinal lumen, gastrointestinal wall enzymes, bacterial enzymes and hepatic enzymes.

== Hepatic first-pass ==
After a water-soluble drug is swallowed, it is absorbed by the digestive system and enters the hepatic portal system. It is carried through the portal vein into the liver before it reaches the rest of the body. The liver metabolizes many drugs, sometimes to such an extent that only a small amount of active drug emerges from the liver to the rest of the circulatory system. This first pass through the liver thus may greatly reduce the bioavailability of the drug.

An example of a drug where first-pass metabolism is a complication and disadvantage is in the antiviral drug remdesivir. Remdesivir cannot be administered orally because the entire dose would be trapped in the liver with little achieving systemic circulation or reaching target organs and cells (for example, cells infected with SARS-CoV-2). For this reason, remdesivir is administered by IV infusion, bypassing the portal vein. However, significant hepatic extraction still occurs because of second pass metabolism, whereby a fraction of venous blood travels through the hepatic portal vein and hepatocytes.

== Drug design ==
In drug design, drug candidates may have good druglikeness but fail on first-pass metabolism because it is biochemically selective. Physiologically based pharmacokinetic models (PBPK) are used to predict first-pass metabolism, although they require compound-specific adjustments due to variability in intestinal mucosal permeability and other factors. Enzyme expression also varies between individuals, which may influence the efficiency of first-pass metabolism and thus the bioavailability of the drug.

Cytochromes P450, especially CYP3A4, play a crucial role in first-pass metabolism, affecting the bioavailability of drugs.

== Mitigation ==
Converting a drug into a prodrug can help avoid first-pass metabolism, thereby improving its bioavailability. In in vitro models, such as the use of microfluidic chips that simulate the gut and liver, allow first-pass metabolism to be studied more accurately, facilitating the development of drugs with better absorption profiles.

=== Routes of administration ===
Alternative routes of administration, such as insufflation, rectal administration, intravenous, intramuscular, inhalational aerosol, transdermal, or sublingual, avoid or partially avoid the first pass effect because they allow drugs to be absorbed directly into the systemic circulation.

Drugs with high first pass effect typically have a considerably higher oral dose than sublingual or parenteral dose. There is marked individual variation in the oral dose due to differences in the extent of first-pass metabolism, frequently among several other factors. Oral bioavailability of many vulnerable drugs appears to be increased in patients with compromised liver function. Bioavailability is also increased if another drug competing for first-pass metabolism enzymes is given concurrently (e.g., propranolol and chlorpromazine).

== See also ==
- ADME, an acronym in pharmacokinetics and pharmacology standing for absorption, distribution, metabolism, and excretion
- Biopharmaceutics Classification System
- Enteral administration
- Partition coefficient
