= Small molecule =

Organic molecule weighing under 1000 daltons

In molecular biology and pharmacology, a small molecule or micromolecule is a low molecular weight (≤ 1000 daltons) organic compound that may regulate a biological process, with a size on the order of 1 nm. Larger structures such as nucleic acids and proteins, and many polysaccharides are not small molecules, although their constituent monomers (ribo- or deoxyribonucleotides, amino acids, and monosaccharides, respectively) are often considered small molecules. Small molecules may be used as research tools to probe biological function as well as leads in the development of new therapeutic agents. Some can inhibit a specific function of a protein or disrupt protein–protein interactions.

Pharmacology usually restricts the term "small molecule" to molecules that bind specific biological macromolecules and act as an effector, altering the activity or function of the target. Small molecules can have a variety of biological functions or applications, serving as cell signaling molecules, drugs in medicine, pesticides in farming, and in many other roles. These compounds can be natural (such as secondary metabolites) or artificial (such as antiviral drugs); they may have a beneficial effect against a disease (such as drugs) or may be detrimental (such as teratogens and carcinogens).

== Molecular weight cutoff ==
The upper molecular-weight limit for a small molecule is approximately 900 daltons, which allows for the possibility to rapidly diffuse across cell membranes so that it can reach intracellular sites of action. This molecular weight cutoff is also a necessary but insufficient condition for oral bioavailability as it allows for transcellular transport through intestinal epithelial cells. In addition to intestinal permeability, the molecule must also possess a reasonably rapid rate of dissolution into water and adequate water solubility and moderate to low first pass metabolism. A somewhat lower molecular weight cutoff of 500 daltons (as part of the "rule of five") has been recommended for oral small molecule drug candidates based on the observation that clinical attrition rates are significantly reduced if the molecular weight is kept below this limit.

== Drugs ==
Most pharmaceuticals are small molecules - they are equivalent in the literature, although some drugs can be proteins (e.g., insulin and other biologic medical products). With the exception of therapeutic antibodies, many proteins are degraded if administered orally and most often cannot cross cell membranes. Small molecules are more likely to be absorbed, although some of them are only absorbed after oral administration if given as prodrugs. One advantage that small-molecule drugs (SMDs) have over "large-molecule" biologics is that many small molecules can be taken orally whereas biologics generally require injection or another parenteral administration. Small molecule drugs are also typically simpler to manufacture and cheaper for the purchaser. A downside is that not all targets are amenable to modification with small-molecule drugs; bacteria and cancers are often resistant to their effects.

== Secondary metabolites ==
A variety of organisms including bacteria, fungi, and plants, produce small molecule secondary metabolites also known as natural products, which play a role in cell signaling, pigmentation and in defense against predation. Secondary metabolites are a rich source of biologically active compounds and hence are often used as research tools and leads for drug discovery. Examples of secondary metabolites include:

- Alkaloids
- Glycosides
- Lipids
- Nonribosomal peptides, such as actinomycin-D
- Phenazines
- Natural phenols (including flavonoids)
- Polyketide
- Terpenes and terpenoids, including steroids
- Tetrapyrroles.

== Research tools ==
Cell culture example of a small molecule as a tool instead of a protein. In cell culture to obtain a pancreatic lineage from mesodermal stem cells, the retinoic acid signaling pathway must be activated while the sonic hedgehog pathway inhibited, which can be done by adding to the media anti-shh antibodies, Hedgehog interacting protein, or cyclopamine, where the first two molecules are proteins and the last a small molecule.

Enzymes and receptors are often activated or inhibited by endogenous protein, but can be also inhibited by endogenous or exogenous small molecule inhibitors or activators, which can bind to the active site or on the allosteric site.

An example is the teratogen and carcinogen phorbol 12-myristate 13-acetate, which is a plant terpene that activates protein kinase C, which promotes cancer, making it a useful investigative tool. There is also interest in creating small molecule artificial transcription factors to regulate gene expression, examples include wrenchnolol (a wrench shaped molecule).

Binding of ligand can be characterised using a variety of analytical techniques such as surface plasmon resonance, microscale thermophoresis or dual polarisation interferometry to quantify the reaction affinities and kinetic properties and also any induced conformational changes.

== Anti-genomic therapeutics ==
Small-molecule anti-genomic therapeutics, or SMAT, refers to a biodefense technology that targets DNA signatures found in many biological warfare agents. SMATs are new, broad-spectrum drugs that unify antibacterial, antiviral and anti-malarial activities into a single therapeutic that offers substantial cost benefits and logistic advantages for physicians and the military.

== See also ==
- Pharmacology
- Druglikeness
- Lipinski's rule of five
- Metabolite
- Chemogenomics
- Neurotransmitter
- Peptidomimetic
- Macromolecule
