= Lipinski's rule of five =

Rule of thumb to predict if a chemical compound is likely to be an orally active drug

Lipinski's rule of five, also known as Pfizer's rule of five or simply the rule of five (RO5), is a rule of thumb to evaluate druglikeness or determine if a chemical compound with a certain pharmacological or biological activity has chemical properties and physical properties that would likely make it an orally active drug in humans. The rule was formulated by Christopher A. Lipinski in 1997, based on the observation that most orally administered drugs are relatively small and moderately lipophilic molecules.

The rule describes molecular properties important for a drug's pharmacokinetics in the human body, including their absorption, distribution, metabolism, and excretion ("ADME"). However, the rule does not predict if a compound is pharmacologically active.

The rule is important to keep in mind during drug discovery when a pharmacologically active lead structure is optimized step-wise to increase the activity and selectivity of the compound as well as to ensure drug-like physicochemical properties are maintained as described by Lipinski's rule. Candidate drugs that conform to the RO5 tend to have lower attrition rates during clinical trials and hence have an increased chance of reaching the market.

Omeprazole is a popular drug that conforms to Lipinski's rule of five.

Some authors have criticized the rule of five for the implicit assumption that passive diffusion is the only important mechanism for the entry of drugs into cells, ignoring the role of transporters. For example, O'Hagan and co-authors wrote as follows:

This famous "rule of 5" has been highly influential in this regard, but only about 50 % of orally administered new chemical entities actually obey it.

Studies have also demonstrated that some natural products break the chemical rules used in Lipinski filters such as macrolides and peptides.

== Components of the rule ==
Lipinski's rule states that, in general, an orally active drug has no more than one violation of the following criteria:

- No more than 5 hydrogen bond donors (the total number of nitrogen–hydrogen and oxygen–hydrogen bonds)
- No more than 10 hydrogen bond acceptors (all nitrogen or oxygen atoms)
- A molecular mass less than 500 daltons
- A calculated octanol-water partition coefficient (Clog P) that does not exceed 5

Note that all numbers are multiples of five, which is the origin of the rule's name. As with many other rules of thumb, such as Baldwin's rules for ring closure, there are many exceptions.

== Variants ==
In an attempt to improve the predictions of druglikeness, the rules have spawned many extensions, for example the Ghose filter:

- Partition coefficient log P in −0.4 to +5.6 range
- Molar refractivity from 40 to 130
- Molecular weight from 180 to 480
- Number of atoms from 20 to 70 (includes H-bond donors [e.g. OHs and NHs] and H-bond acceptors [e.g. Ns and Os])

Veber's Rule further questions a 500 molecular weight cutoff. The polar surface area and the number of rotatable bonds has been found to better discriminate between compounds that are orally active and those that are not for a large data set of compounds. In particular, compounds which meet only the two criteria of:

- 10 or fewer rotatable bonds and
- Polar surface area no greater than 140 Å^{2}

are predicted to have good oral bioavailability.

== Lead-like ==
During drug discovery, lipophilicity and molecular weight are often increased in order to improve the affinity and selectivity of the drug candidate. As a result, it is often difficult to maintain drug-likeness (i.e., RO5 compliance) during hit and lead optimization. To solve this problem, it has been proposed that members of screening libraries from which hits are discovered should be biased toward lower molecular weight and lipophilicity so that medicinal chemists will have an easier time in delivering optimized drug development candidates that are also drug-like. Hence the rule of five has been extended to the rule of three (RO3) for defining lead-like compounds.

A rule of three compliant compound is defined as one that has:

- octanol-water partition coefficient log P not greater than 3
- molecular mass less than 300 daltons
- not more than 3 hydrogen bond donors
- not more than 3 hydrogen bond acceptors
- not more than 3 rotatable bonds

== See also ==
- Biopharmaceutics Classification System
- Chemical structure
- Chemicalize.org § List of the predicted structure based properties
- Fragment-based lead discovery
- QSAR
