= Octanol-water partition coefficient =

Measure of lipophilicity and hydrophilicity

The n-octanol-water partition coefficient, K_{ow} is a partition coefficient for the two-phase system consisting of n-octanol and water. K_{ow} is also frequently referred to by the symbol P, especially in the English literature. It is also called n-octanol-water partition ratio.

K_{ow} serves as a measure of the relationship between lipophilicity (fat solubility) and hydrophilicity (water solubility) of a substance. The value is greater than one if a substance is more soluble in fat-like solvents such as n-octanol, and less than one if it is more soluble in water.

If a substance is present as several chemical species in the octanol-water system due to association or dissociation, each species is assigned its own K_{ow} value. A related value, D, does not distinguish between different species, only indicating the concentration ratio of the substance between the two phases.

== History ==
In 1899, Charles Ernest Overton and Hans Horst Meyer independently proposed that the tadpole toxicity of non-ionizable organic compounds depends on their ability to partition into lipophilic compartments of cells. They further proposed the use of the partition coefficient in an olive oil/water mixture as an estimate of this lipophilic associated toxicity. Corwin Hansch later proposed the use of n-octanol as an inexpensive synthetic alcohol that could be obtained in a pure form as an alternative to olive oil.

== Applications ==
K_{ow} values are used, among others, to assess the environmental fate of persistent organic pollutants. Chemicals with high partition coefficients, for example, tend to accumulate in the fatty tissue of organisms (bioaccumulation). Under the Stockholm Convention, chemicals with a log K_{ow} greater than 5 are considered to bioaccumulate.

Furthermore, the parameter plays an important role in drug research (Rule of Five) and toxicology. Ernst Overton and Hans Meyer discovered as early as 1900 that the efficacy of an anaesthetic increased with increasing K_{ow} value (the so-called Meyer-Overton rule).

K_{ow} values also provide a good estimate of how a substance is distributed within a cell between the lipophilic biomembranes and the aqueous cytosol.

== Estimation ==
Since it is not possible to measure K_{ow} for all substances, various models have been developed to allow for their prediction, e.g. Quantitative structure–activity relationships (QSAR) or linear free energy relationships (LFER) such as the Hammett equation.

A variant of the UNIFAC system can also be used to estimate octanol-water partition coefficients. Under REACH, estimates are often derived by EPI Suite or COSMOtherm.

== Equations ==
=== Definition of the K_{ow} or P-value ===
The K_{ow} or P-value always only refers to a single species or substance:

$$K_\mathrm{ow} = P = \frac{c_o^{S_i}}{c_w^{S_i}}$$

with:

- $c_o^{S_i}$ concentration of species i of a substance in the octanol-rich phase
- $c_w^{S_i}$ concentration of species i of a substance in the water-rich phase

If different species occur in the octanol-water system by dissociation or association, several P-values and one D-value exist for the system. If, on the other hand, the substance is only present in a single species, the P and D values are identical.

P is usually expressed as a common logarithm, i.e. $\log P$ (also log P_{ow} or, less frequently, Log pOW):

$$\log{P} = \log \frac{c_o^{S_i}}{c_w^{S_i}} = \log c_o^{S_i} - \log c_w^{S_i}$$

$\log P$ is positive for lipophilic and negative for hydrophilic substances or species.

=== Definition of the D-value ===
The P-value only correctly refers to the concentration ratio of a single substance distributed between the octanol and water phases. In the case of a substance that occurs as multiple species, it can therefore be calculated by summing the concentrations of all n species in the octanol phase and the concentrations of all n species in the aqueous phase:

$$D =  \frac{c_o}{c_w} = \frac{c_o^{S_1} + c_o^{S_2} + \dots + c_o^{S_n}}{c_w^{S_1} + c_w^{S_2} + \dots + c_w^{S_n}}$$

with:

- $c_o$ concentration of the substance in the octanol-rich phase
- $c_w$ concentration of the substance in the water-rich phase

D values are also usually given in the form of the common logarithm as Log D:

$$\log{D} = \log \frac{c_o}{c_w} = \log c_o - \log c_w$$

Like $\log P$, $\log D$ is positive for lipophilic and negative for hydrophilic substances. While P values are largely independent of the pH value of the aqueous phase due to their restriction to only one species, D values are often strongly dependent on the pH value of the aqueous phase.

== Example values ==
Values for log K_{ow} typically range between -3 (very hydrophilic) and +10 (extremely lipophilic/hydrophobic).

The values listed here are sorted by the partition coefficient. Acetamide is hydrophilic, and 2,2′,4,4′,5-Pentachlorobiphenyl is lipophilic.

Substance	log K_{OW}	T	Reference
Acetamide	−1.155	25 °C	
Methanol	−0.824	19 °C	
Formic acid	−0.413	25 °C	
Diethyl ether	0.833	20 °C	
p-Dichlorobenzene	3.370	25 °C	
Hexamethylbenzene	4.610	25 °C	
2,2′,4,4′,5-Pentachlorobiphenyl	6.410	Ambient	

== See also ==
- Hydrophobic effect
- Dortmund Data Bank
