= Lead compound =

Concept in drug discovery

A lead compound (/ˈliːd/, i.e., a "leading" compound; not to be confused with various compounds of the element lead) in drug discovery is a chemical compound that has pharmacological or biological activity likely to be therapeutically useful, but may nevertheless have suboptimal structure that requires modification to fit better to the target; lead drugs offer the prospect of being followed by "back-up" compounds. The chemical structure serves as a starting point for chemical modifications in order to improve potency, selectivity, or pharmacokinetic parameters. Furthermore, newly-invented pharmacologically active moieties may have poor druglikeness and may require chemical modification to become "drug-like" enough to be tested biologically or clinically.

Lead compounds are sometimes called developmental candidates. This is because the discovery and selection of lead compounds occurs prior to preclinical and clinical development of the candidate.

== Discovering lead compounds ==
=== Discovery of a drugable target ===
Before lead compounds can be discovered, a suitable target for rational drug design must be selected on the basis of biological plausibility, or identified through screening potential lead compounds against multiple targets. Drug libraries are often tested by high-throughput screenings (active compounds are designated as "hits") which can screen compounds for their ability to inhibit (antagonize) or stimulate (agonize) a target of interest as well as determine selectivity for these targets.

=== Development of a lead compound ===
A lead compound may arise from a variety of different sources. Lead compounds are found by characterizing natural products, employing combinatorial chemistry, or by molecular modeling as in rational drug design. Chemicals identified as "hits" through high-throughput screening may also become lead compounds.

Once a lead compound is selected, it must undergo lead optimization, which involves making the compound more "drug-like." This is where Lipinski's rule of five comes into play, sometimes also referred to as the "Pfizer rule" or simply as the "rule of five". Other factors, such as the ease of scaling up the manufacturing of the chemical, must be taken into consideration as well.

== See also ==
- Drug development – Process of bringing a new pharmaceutical drug to the market
- Drug design – Invention of new medications based on knowledge of a biological target
  - Rational drug design – Invention of new medications based on knowledge of a biological target
- Drug discovery hit to lead – Stage of drug discovery
  - Lead optimization – Stage of drug discovery
