= Microscale thermophoresis =

Biophysical technology for analyzing interactions

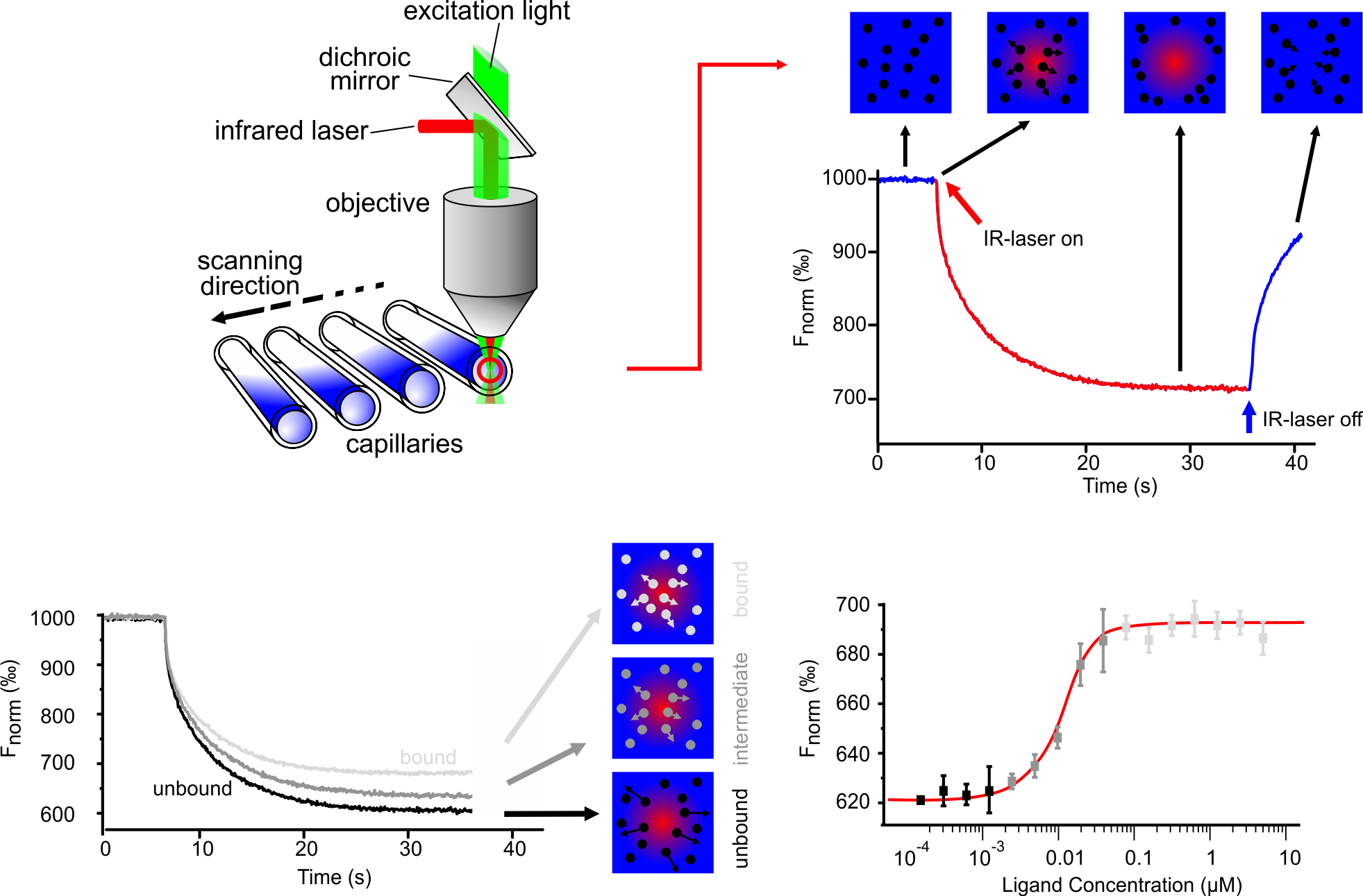
Principle of the MST technology: MST is performed in thin capillaries in free solution thus providing close-to-native conditions (immobilization free in any buffer, even in complex bioliquids) and a maintenance free instrument. When performing an MST experiment, a microscopic temperature gradient is induced by an infrared laser, and TRIC as well as thermophoresis are detected. TRIC depends on the fluorophore's microenvironment, which is typically changed in binding events. Thermophoresis, the movement of the molecule in the temperature gradient, depends on three parameters that typically change upon interaction. Thus, the overall MST signal is plotted against the ligand concentration to obtain a dose-response curve, from which the binding affinity can be deduced.

Microscale thermophoresis (MST) is a technology for the biophysical analysis of interactions between biomolecules. Microscale thermophoresis is based on the detection of a temperature-induced change in fluorescence of a target as a function of the concentration of a non-fluorescent ligand. The observed change in fluorescence is based on two distinct effects. On the one hand it is based on a temperature related intensity change (TRIC) of the fluorescent probe, which can be affected by binding events. On the other hand, it is based on thermophoresis, the directed movement of particles in a microscopic temperature gradient. Any change of the chemical microenvironment of the fluorescent probe, as well as changes in the hydration shell of biomolecules result in a relative change of the fluorescence detected when a temperature gradient is applied and can be used to determine binding affinities. MST allows measurement of interactions directly in solution without the need of immobilization to a surface (immobilization-free technology).

== Applications ==
=== Affinity ===
- Between any kind of biomolecules including proteins, DNA, RNA, peptides, small molecules, fragments and ions
- For interactions with high molecular weight complexes, large molecule assemblies, even with liposomes, vesicles, nanodiscs, nanoparticles and viruses
- In any buffer, including serum and cell lysate
- In competition experiments (for example with substrate and inhibitors)

=== Thermodynamic parameters ===
MST has been used to estimate the enthalpic and entropic contributions to biomolecular interactions.

=== Additional information ===
- Sample property (homogeneity, aggregation, stability)
- Multiple binding sites, cooperativity

== Technology ==
MST is based on the quantifiable detection of a fluorescence change in a sample when a temperature change is applied. The fluorescence of a target molecule can be extrinsic or intrinsic (aromatic amino acids) and is altered in temperature gradients due to two distinct effects. On the one hand temperature related intensity change (TRIC), which describes the intrinsic property of fluorophores to change their fluorescence intensity as a function of temperature. The extent of the change in fluorescence intensity is affected by the chemical environment of the fluorescent probe, which can be altered in binding events due to conformational changes or proximity of ligands. On the other hand, MST is also based on the directed movement of molecules along temperature gradients, an effect termed thermophoresis. A spatial temperature difference ΔT leads to a change in molecule concentration in the region of elevated temperature, quantified by the Soret coefficient S_{T}:c_{hot}/c_{cold} = exp(-S_{T} ΔT). Both, TRIC and thermophoresis contribute to the recorded signal in MST measurements in the following way: ∂/∂T(cF)=c∂F/∂T+F∂c/∂T. The first term in this equation c∂F/∂T describes TRIC as a change in fluorescence intensity (F) as a function of temperature (T), whereas the second term F∂c/∂T describes thermophoresis as the change in particle concentration (c) as a function of temperature. Thermophoresis depends on the interface between molecule and solvent. Under constant buffer conditions, thermophoresis probes the size, charge and solvation entropy of the molecules. The thermophoresis of a fluorescently labeled molecule A typically differs significantly from the thermophoresis of a molecule-target complex AT due to size, charge and solvation entropy differences. This difference in the molecule's thermophoresis is used to quantify the binding in titration experiments under constant buffer conditions.

The thermophoretic movement of the fluorescently labelled molecule is measured by monitoring the fluorescence distribution F inside a capillary. The microscopic temperature gradient is generated by an IR-Laser, which is focused into the capillary and is strongly absorbed by water. The temperature of the aqueous solution in the laser spot is raised by ΔT=1-10 K. Before the IR-Laser is switched on a homogeneous fluorescence distribution F_{cold} is observed inside the capillary. When the IR-Laser is switched on, two effects, occur on the same time-scale, contributing to the new fluorescence distribution F_{hot}. The thermal relaxation induces a binding-dependent drop in the fluorescence of the dye due to its local environmental-dependent response to the temperature jump (TRIC). At the same time molecules typically move from the locally heated region to the outer cold regions. The local concentration of molecules decreases in the heated region until it reaches a steady-state distribution.

While the mass diffusion D dictates the kinetics of depletion, S_{T} determines the steady-state concentration ratio c_{hot}/c_{cold}=exp(-S_{T} ΔT) ≈ 1-S_{T} ΔT under a temperature increase ΔT. The normalized fluorescence F_{norm}=F_{hot}/F_{cold} measures mainly this concentration ratio, in addition to TRIC ∂F/∂T. In the linear approximation we find: F_{norm}=1+(∂F/∂T-S_{T})ΔT. Due to the linearity of the fluorescence intensity and the thermophoretic depletion, the normalized fluorescence from the unbound molecule F_{norm}(A) and the bound complex F_{norm}(AT) superpose linearly. By denoting x the fraction of molecules bound to targets, the changing fluorescence signal during the titration of target T is given by: F_{norm}=(1-x) F_{norm}(A)+x F_{norm}(AT).

Quantitative binding parameters are obtained by using a serial dilution of the binding substrate. By plotting F_{norm} against the logarithm of the different concentrations of the dilution series, a sigmoidal binding curve is obtained. This binding curve can directly be fitted with the nonlinear solution of the law of mass action, with the dissociation constant K_{D} as result.
