= Idiosyncratic drug reaction =

Rare and unpredictable drug reactions

- Specialty: Emergency medicine

Idiosyncratic drug reactions, also known as type B reactions, are drug reactions that occur rarely and unpredictably amongst the population. This is not to be mistaken with idiopathic, which implies that the cause is not known. They frequently occur with exposure to new drugs, as they have not been fully tested and the full range of possible side-effects have not been discovered; they may also be listed as an adverse drug reaction with a drug, but are extremely rare. Some patients have multiple-drug intolerance. Patients who have multiple idiopathic effects that are nonspecific are more likely to have anxiety and depression. Idiosyncratic drug reactions appear to not be concentration dependent. A minimal amount of drug will cause an immune response, but it is suspected that at a low enough concentration, a drug will be less likely to initiate an immune response.

== Mechanism ==
In adverse drug reactions involving overdoses, the toxic effect is simply an extension of the pharmacological effect (Type A adverse drug reactions). On the other hand, clinical symptoms of idiosyncratic drug reactions (Type B adverse drug reactions) are different from the pharmacological effect of the drug.

The proposed mechanism of most idiosyncratic drug reactions is immune-mediated toxicity. To create an immune response, a foreign molecule must be present that antibodies can bind to (i.e. the antigen) and cellular damage must exist. Very often, drugs will not be immunogenic because they are too small to induce immune response. However, a drug can cause an immune response if the drug binds a larger molecule. Some unaltered drugs, such as penicillin, will bind avidly to proteins. Others must be bioactivated into a toxic compound that will in turn bind to proteins. The second criterion of cellular damage can come either from a toxic drug/drug metabolite, or from an injury or infection. These will sensitize the immune system to the drug and cause a response. Idiosyncratic reactions fall conventionally under toxicology.

== See also ==
- Idiosyncrasy
- Allergy
