= Earth, Moon, and Planets =

- Discipline: Planetary science
- Language: English
- Edited by: J.D. Gilmour

Publication details
- Former name(s): The Moon, The Moon and the Planets
- History: 1969–present
- Publisher: Springer Science+Business Media (Germany)
- Frequency: 8/year
- Impact factor: 0.667 (2018)

Standard abbreviations
- ISO 4: Earth Moon Planets

Indexing
- CODEN: EMPLD3
- ISSN: 0167-9295 (print); 1573-0794 (web)
- LCCN: 84643883
- OCLC no.: 10610068

Links
- Journal homepage; Online access

Earth, Moon, and Planets is a peer-reviewed scientific journal, published approximately ten times per year by Springer Science+Business Media. It was established in 1969 under the title The Moon, was known as The Moon and the Planets from 1978 to 1983, and was first published under the current title in February 1984. The editor-in-chief is Jamie D. Gilmour (University of Manchester). The journal's main focus is on research about the Solar System. Besides original research articles, Earth, Moon, and Planets publishes conference proceedings, review articles, book reviews, and special issues.

== Aims and scope ==
Earth, Moon, and Planets focuses on original research articles on formation of stars and planets, evolution of the Solar System including its origin, and the evolution of extra-solar systems including their origins. The focus also includes asteroids, comets, meteoroids, and near-Earth objects, Earth impact hazards, the Solar System-Earth relationship, and related topics. Research coverage encompasses physical and chemical properties of the above-mentioned celestial bodies, and their related chaotic behavior.

== History ==
Under the title The Moon, the journal was conceived by Zdeněk Kopal, Hannes Alfvén, and Harold Urey in 1969 in response to the Apollo 11 Moon Landing that same year. Its aim was to provide an interdisciplinary but monothematic medium for publication of the results of original investigations in all fields of lunar studies. It was published under the Dutch publisher Reidel, which would later join with Kluwer and be merged into Springer Nature. In 1978, the journal broadened its scope to the full solar system, changing its name to The Moon and the Planets. In 1983, the journal changed its name once again to Earth, Moon, and Planets as it expanded to cover the study of the Earth from a planetary sciences standpoint.

The journal's Editors-in-Chief have been Zdeněk Kopal, Vladímir Vanýsek, Mark E. Bailey, Giovanni Valsecchi, Murthy S. Gudipati, and Jamie D. Gilmour.

== Rebranding ==
In 2024, the journal was re-launched under the name Discover Space as a fully open-access journal that supports multidisciplinary research and policy developments across all fields relevant to space science.

== Abstracting and indexing ==
This journal is abstracted and indexed in the following databases:

- Academic OneFile
- Astrophysics Data System
- Chemical Abstracts Service/CASSI
- ProQuest
- Current Contents/Physical, Chemical and Earth Sciences
- EBSCO databases
- GEOBASE
- INIS
- Inspec
- Science Citation Index
- Scopus
- Zentralblatt MATH
