= Molecular property =

Molecular properties include the chemical properties, physical properties, and structural properties of molecules, including drugs. Molecular properties typically do not include pharmacological or biological properties of a chemical compound.

== See also ==
- Biological activity
- Chemical property
- Chemical structure
- Lipinski's rule of five, describing molecular properties of drugs
- Physical property
- QSAR, quantitative structure-activity relationship
