= Zámečník =

Zámečník or Zamecnik (feminine: Zámečníková ) is a Czech language occupational surname for a locksmith and may refer to:

- Dana Zámečníková, Czech sculptor
- John Stepan Zamecnik (1872–1953), American composer and conductor
- Paul Zamecnik (1912–2009), American scientist
