= Biological activity =

Effects of a drug on living things

In pharmacology, biological activity or pharmacological activity describes the beneficial or adverse effects of a drug on living matter. When a drug is a complex chemical mixture, this activity is exerted by the substance's active ingredient or pharmacophore but can be modified by the other constituents. Among the various properties of chemical compounds, pharmacological/biological activity plays a crucial role since it suggests uses of the compounds in the medical applications. However, chemical compounds may show some adverse and toxic effects which may prevent their use in medical practice.

In the study of biomineralisation, bioactivity is often meant to mean the formation of calcium phosphate deposits on the surface of objects placed in simulated body fluid; a buffer solution with ion content similar to blood.

== Measurement ==
Biological activity is usually measured by a bioassay and the activity is generally dosage-dependent, which is investigated via dose-response curves. Further, it is common to have effects ranging from beneficial to adverse for one substance when going from low to high doses. Activity depends critically on fulfillment of the ADME criteria. To be an effective drug, a compound not only must be active against a target, but also possess the appropriate ADME (Absorption, Distribution, Metabolism, and Excretion) properties necessary to make it suitable for use as a drug. Because of the costs of the measurement, biological activities are often predicted with computational methods, so-called QSAR models.

== Applications ==
Whereas a material is considered bioactive if it has interaction with or effect on any cell tissue in the human body, pharmacological activity is usually taken to describe beneficial effects, i.e. the effects of drug candidates as well as a substance's toxicity.

=== Dental implants ===
Bioactivity is a key property that promotes osseointegration for bonding and better stability of dental implants. Bioglass coatings represent high surface area and reactivity leading to an effective interaction of the coating material and surrounding bone tissues. In the biological environment, the formation of a layer of carbonated hydroxyapatite (CHA) initiates bonding to the bone tissues. The bioglass surface coating undergoes leaching/exchange of ions, dissolution of glass, and formation of the HA layer that promotes cellular response of tissues. The high specific surface area of bioactive glasses is likely to induce quicker solubility of the material, availability of ions in the surrounding area, and enhanced protein adsorption ability. These factors altogether contribute toward the bioactivity of bioglass coatings. In addition, tissue mineralization (bone, teeth) is promoted while tissue forming cells are in direct contact with bioglass materials.

== See also ==
- Chemical property
- Chemical structure
- Lipinski's rule of five, describing molecular properties of drugs
- Molecular property
- Physical property
- QSAR, quantitative structure-activity relationship
