= Miqin Zhang =

American materials scientist and academic

- Education: University of California, Berkeley
- Scientific career
- Workplaces: University of Washington
- Thesis: Silicon surface bioengineering for tailored protein adsorption and controlled cellular behavior (1999)

Miqin Zhang is an American materials scientist who is the Kyocera Professor of Materials Science at the University of Washington. Her research considers the development of new biomaterials for medical applications. Her group develops nanoparticles for cancer diagnosis and imaging, biocompatible materials for drug delivery and cell-based biosensors.

== Early life and education ==
Zhang earned her doctorate at the University of California, Berkeley. Her doctoral research considered bioengineering of silicon surfaces for controlled protein adsorption.

== Research and career ==
In 1999, Zhang joined the faculty at the University of Washington, where she was made professor in 2008. She has developed new biomaterials for the diagnosis and detection of disease. Her research focused on three activities; the development of nanoparticles for cancer diagnosis and treatment, the realization of materials to serve as biodegradable scaffolds and the development of cellular biosensors for detecting chemical agents.

Zhang developed novel synthesis strategies for the creation of functionalized nanoparticles. Nanovectors are nanoparticle cores that are surrounded by an agent that targets cells with specific functionality. Zhang designed a nanovector that can target glioma, a form of brain cancer. The Zhang nanovector was based on a superparamagnetic iron oxide core, a polyethylene glycol coating, a chlorotoxin targeting agent and a fluorescent dye. The cyanine-based dye emits infrared light, which can penetrate brain tissue. Her nanoparticles could be traced using both MRI and fluorescence microscopy.

Zhang has also developed nanofibrous matrices from polymeric materials to use in tissue engineering and regenerative medicine. She has also developed hydrogels that can be used for drug delivery.

To detect and identify biological agents, Zhang has developed surface modification techniques to pattern proteins and live cells. She makes use of receptor mediated cell adhesion, a technique which involves immobilizing proteins on electrodes which can be patterned.

== Selected publications ==
- Conroy Sun; Jerry Ssu-Hsien Lee; Miqin Zhang (10 April 2008). "Magnetic nanoparticles in MR imaging and drug delivery". Advanced Drug Delivery Reviews. 60 (11): 1252–1265. doi:10.1016/j.addr.2008.03.018. ISSN 0169-409X. PMC 2702670. PMID 18558452. Wikidata Q37192908.
- Narayan Bhattarai; Jonathan Gunn; Miqin Zhang (30 September 2009). "Chitosan-based hydrogels for controlled, localized drug delivery". Advanced Drug Delivery Reviews. 62 (1): 83–99. doi:10.1016/j.addr.2009.07.019. ISSN 0169-409X. PMID 19799949. Wikidata Q37607445.
- Omid Veiseh; Jonathan W Gunn; Miqin Zhang (10 November 2009). "Design and fabrication of magnetic nanoparticles for targeted drug delivery and imaging". Advanced Drug Delivery Reviews. 62 (3): 284–304. doi:10.1016/j.addr.2009.11.002. ISSN 0169-409X. PMC 2827645. PMID 19909778. Wikidata Q37631874.
