= Beztrwogi coat of arms =

Polish coat of arms

Beztrwogi
- Earliest mention: 1844
- Families: Lipiński

Beztrwogi is a Polish coat of arms. It was used by the Lipiński family in Congress Poland.

== Notable bearers ==
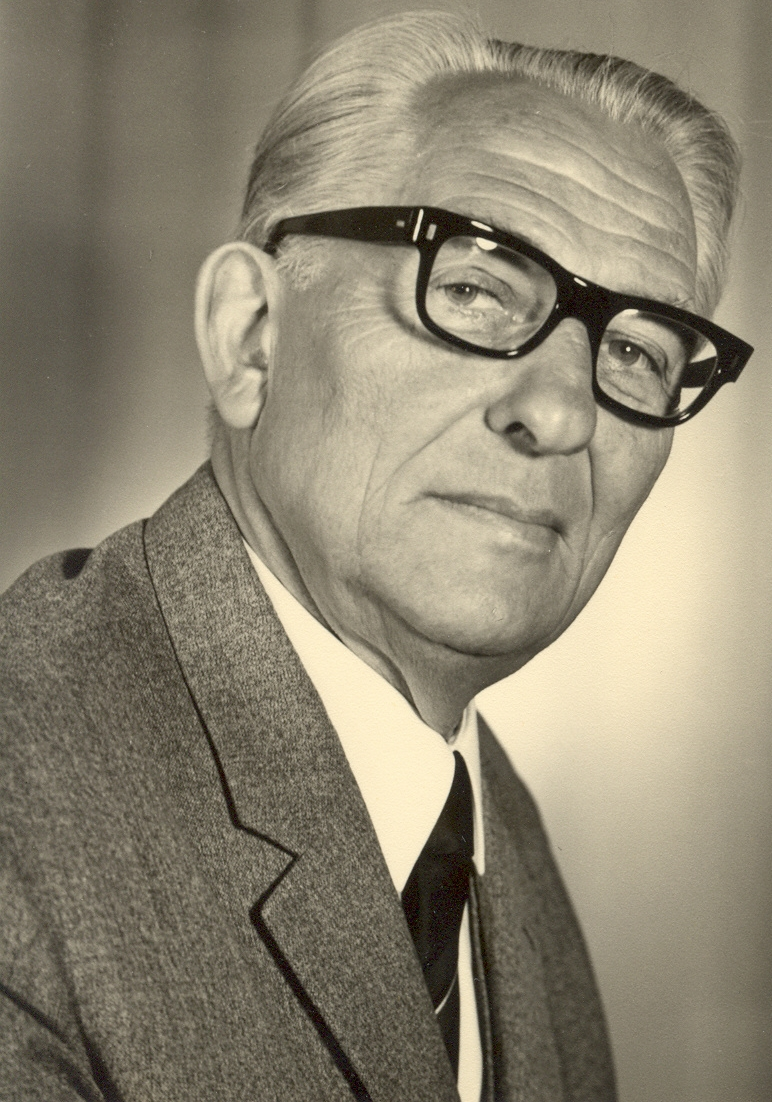
Wilhelm Lipinski (1976)

Notable bearers of this coat of arms include:

- Wilhelm Lipiński

== See also ==
- Polish heraldry
- Heraldic family
- List of Polish nobility coats of arms

== Bibliography ==
- Tadeusz Gajl: Herbarz polski od średniowiecza do XX wieku : ponad 4500 herbów szlacheckich 37 tysięcy nazwisk 55 tysięcy rodów. L&L, 2007. ISBN 978-83-60597-10-1.
