= Sipiński =

Sipiński (feminine: Sipińska) is a Polish surname. Notable people with the surname include:

- Urszula Sipińska (born 1947), Polish singer-songwriter, architect, and writer

== See also ==
- Lipiński
