= Marian Karel =

Czech sculptor and university professor

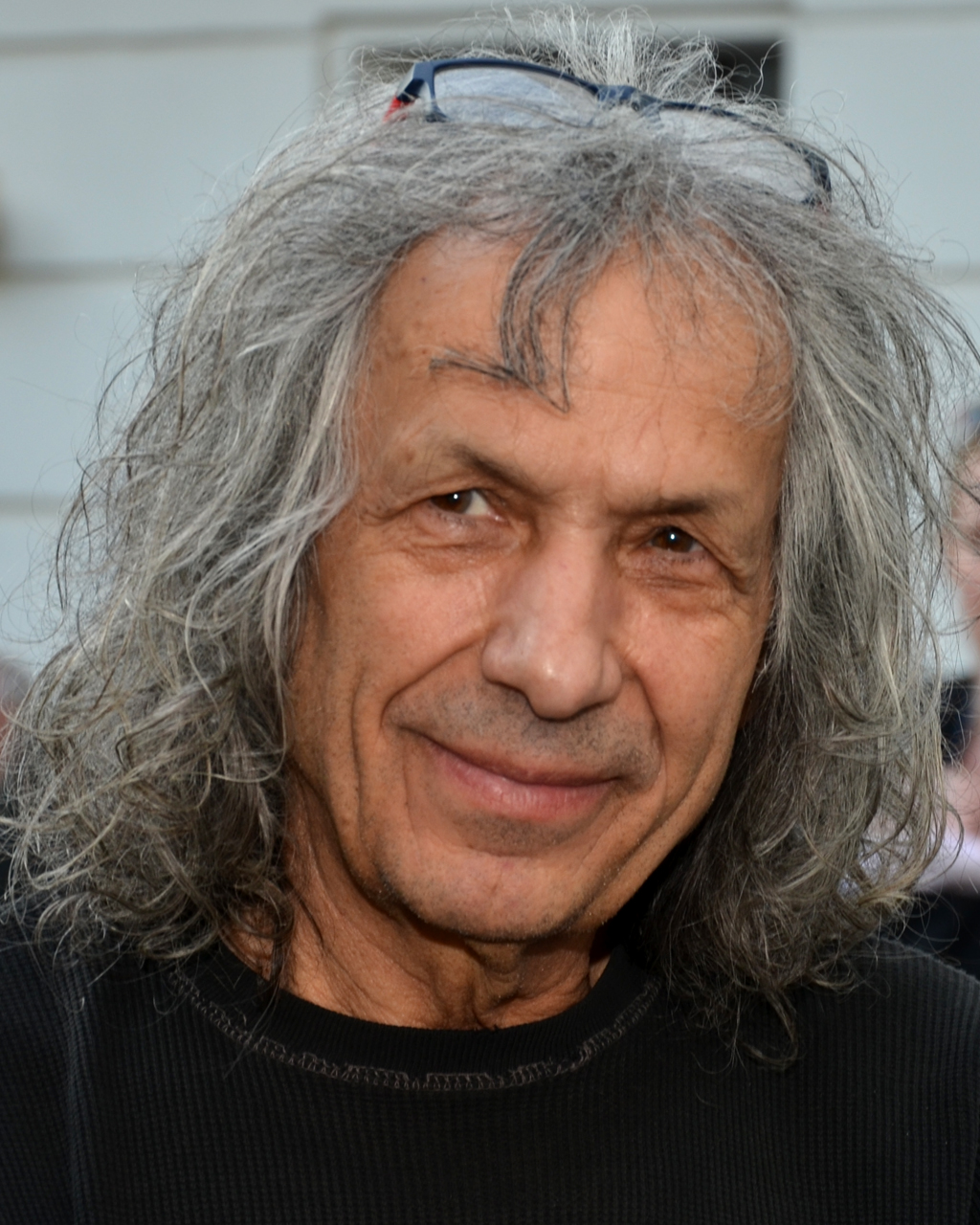
- Marian Karel in 2018
- Born: 21 August 1944 (age 81); Pardubice, Protectorate of Bohemia and Moravia
- Education: Central School of Applied Arts in Jablonec nad Nisou; Stanislav Libenský the Academy of Arts, Architecture and Design in Prague
- Known for: sculptor and university professor
- Notable work: 2004 - Statue of astronomy professor Zdeněk Kopal in Litomyšl; 2006 - Statues of Prague at the Prague Congress Centre; 2010 - Gate of time and historiogram statue in the square of King George of Poděbrady in Cheb
- Spouse: Dana Zámečníková
- Website: https://web.archive.org/web/20150406003519/http://www.mariankarel.cz/

Marian Karel (born 21 August 1944), is a Czech sculptor and university professor.

== Life and career ==
Karel was born on 21 August 1944 in Pardubice. From 1959 to 1963 he studied at the Central School of Applied Arts in Jablonec nad Nisou. In the years 1965 to 1972 he studied at the studio of Stanislav Libenský at the Academy of Arts, Architecture and Design in Prague.

In 1992 he became Head of the Studio Glass in Architecture at the University of Applied Arts in Prague, and in 1995 he was appointed Professor and the Head of the department of fine arts. His other teaching activities have included posts in the United States, the United Kingdom, Japan, New Zealand, Finland, France, Ireland and Bulgaria. Since 2009 he has been a professor at the Faculty of Architecture, Technical University, where he heads the Department of Industrial Design.

Karel is married to artist Dana Zámečníková.

== Art work ==
Marian Karel uses light, glass, and geometric forms to make illusionistic sculptures that challenge the viewer's perceptions of space. He has reached an international status within the Minimalistic movement, although he does not fully identify himself with this style. He expresses very simplistic interactions between basic geometrical elements, which very artfully and intricately connect and permeate. He has had several gallery and museum exhibitions, including at the Museum Kampa, The Jan and Meda Mládek Foundation and at the Galerie Karsten Greve, Paris. His works include the following sculptures:

- 1988 – Glass sculpture in front of the Czech pavilion at the 43rd Venice Biennale
- 1991 – The sculpture of polished granite, fused glass and steel, a sports complex, Chitose, Japan
- 1992 – Spatial installation of metal and glass, Czech pavilion at Seville Expo '92
- 2002 – Museum Kampa, Prague: 3 sculptures from glass, steel, stone and wood
- 2004 – Statue of astronomy professor Zdeněk Kopal in Litomyšl
- 2006 – Statues of Prague at the Prague Congress Centre
- 2010 – Gate of time and historiogram statue in the square of King George of Poděbrady in Cheb
