= Lipinsky =

Lipinsky (Russian: Липинский), feminine: Lipinskaya is a Russian-language surname. Polish variant: Lipiński, Belarusian: Lipinski, Ukrainian: Lypynsky; both can be spelled as "Lipinsky" in other languages. Notable persons with the name include:

- Aleksandr Lipinsky (1830-1882), Russian Imperial Army general
- Ann Lipinky, namesake of the 25511 Annlipinsky, minor planet
- Kseniya Lipinskaya (1899-1987), Russian educator, Bolshevik, World War II Soviet partisan
- Valery Lipinsky (1956-2008), Russian general
- Vyacheslav Lypynsky (1882–1931), Ukrainian historian, activist, and political theorist
