= Christopher A. Lipinski =

Medicinal chemist

- Education: University of California, Berkeley
- Known for: Lipinski's rule of five
- Scientific career
- Institutions: Pfizer

Christopher A. Lipinski is a medicinal chemist who is working at Pfizer, Inc. He is known for his "rule of five", an algorithm that predicts drug compounds that are likely to have oral activity. By the number of citations, he is the most cited author of some pharmacology journals: Journal of Pharmacological and Toxicological Methods, Advanced Drug Delivery Reviews, Drug Discovery Today: Technologies.

== Biography ==
Lipinski received his PhD from the University of California, Berkeley in 1968 in physical organic chemistry. The Advanced Drug Delivery Reviews article reporting his "rule of five" is one of the most cited publications in the journal's history. In 2006, he received an honorary law degree from the University of Dundee and he has won various awards, including being the Society for Biomolecular Sciences' winner of the 2006 SBS Achievement Award for Innovation in HTS.
