= Dana Zámečníková =

Czech sculptor

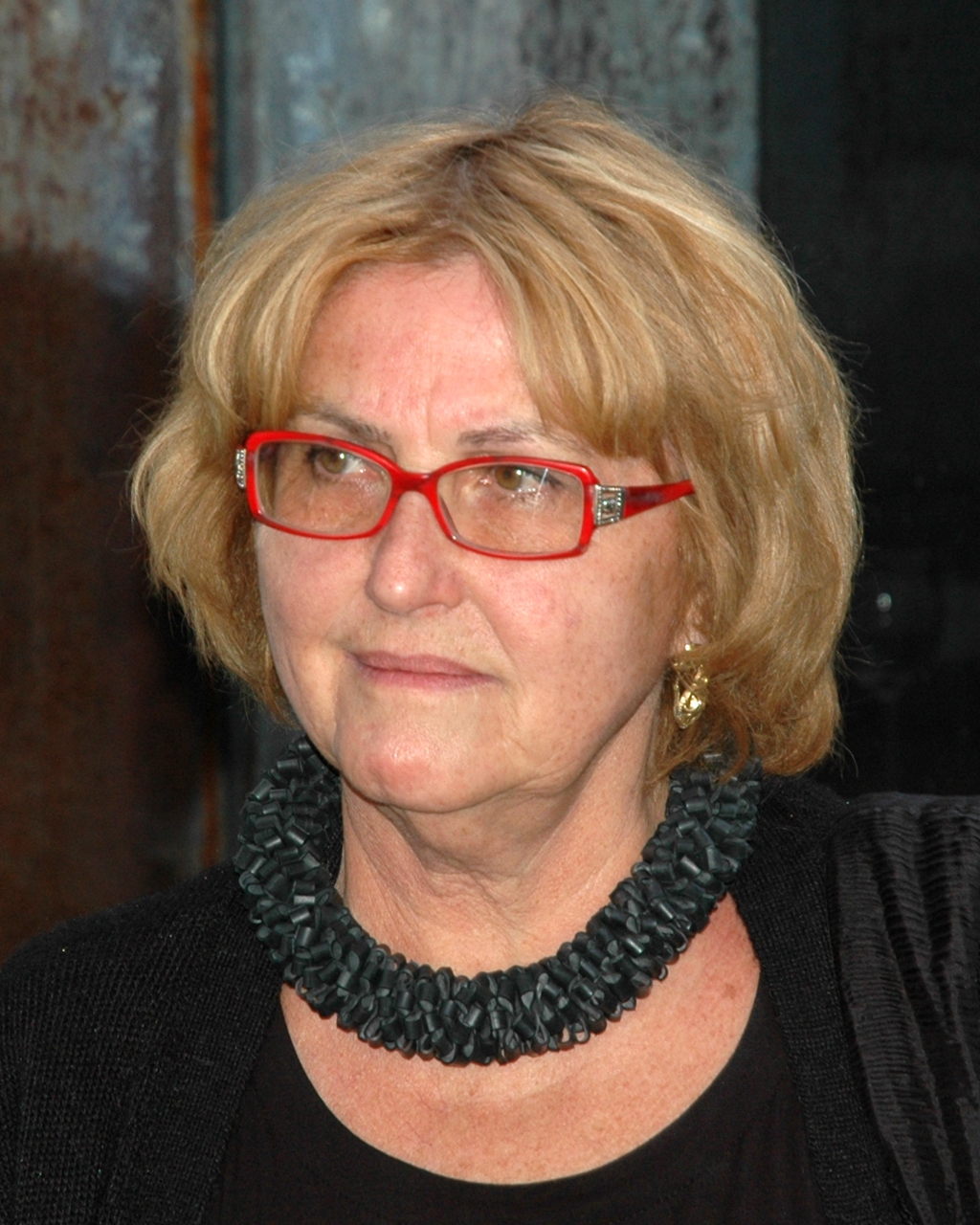
- Dana Zámečníková in 2013
- Born: 24 March 1945 (age 81); Prague, Protectorate of Bohemia and Moravia
- Education: Faculty of Architecture, Czech Technical University in Prague, Academy of Arts, Architecture and Design in Prague
- Known for: glass artist, painter, graphic designer, architect, teacher
- Spouse: Marian Karel

Dana Zámečníková (born 24 March 1945) is a Czech glass artist, painter, graphic artist, architect and teacher. She is considered one of the most important glass artists of the post-war generation that graduated in the 1960s.

== Life ==
Dana Zámečníková was born on 24 March 1945 in Prague. She comes from a family of an architect and inherited her love for painting from her grandfather, who was an amateur landscape painter. From childhood she was a lover of circuses and animals, animal tamers, fairground rides, magicians, and later theatre and cinema. After graduating from high school in Prague, she studied at the Faculty of Architecture of the Czech Technical University in 1962–1968.

After graduating from the Technical University in the summer of 1968, she went to West Germany and worked for a year at the Gottfried Böhm Architecture Department (Lehrstuhl für Werklehre, Die RWTH) in Aachen. After returning to Prague, she studied architecture and scenography at the Academy of Arts, Architecture and Design in Prague (1969–1972) under professor Josef Svoboda and until 1971 she worked simultaneously in the "School"—architectural studio of Karel Hubáček of the Association of Engineers and Architects in Liberec (SIAL).

Since 1980 she has been working as a freelance artist, where she found the necessary freedom. The feminine approach, evident in her works, is emancipated, spontaneous to the point of instinctive and animalistic, but it has nothing to do with feminism.

She began working with glass in the 1970s, but her original approach soon brought her attention abroad and she enjoyed a steep career in the 1980s. Her works have been purchased by major international collections in the US, Europe, Japan and Australia, and in 1993 she was one of seven artists worldwide invited to create a monumental Theatrum mundi in a 10 × 10 × 10 m space for one of the atria of the new glass museum building in Corning, New York.

She has worked as a guest lecturer at universities and glass schools abroad since the 1980s - Summer glass courses at Pilchuck School in Washington State, 1983, 1984, 1989, 1996, Philadelphia and Kent State University in Ohio, 1987, 1993, San Francisco State University, 1992, British Artists in Glass, Bag, England, 1986, Sydney, 1991, Mexico City, 1992, Japan: Miasa, 1988, Nlijima Glass Center, 1992, Toyama, 1998, Auckland, New Zealand, 1998, Tampa, Jacksonville University, US, 1999, Glass art and Science, Lisbon, 1999. In 1985 she was appointed associate professor of Glass at the Pilchuck Summer School in the US.

Dana Zámečníková is the wife of Marian Karel. She is a member of Umělecká beseda. Since 1997 she has been one of the donors whose works are auctioned in the annual auction for Konto Bariéry, (Charter 77 Foundation). She lives in Prague, in a house whose minimalist interior she designed herself. It includes a studio with its own furnace and a hall that serves as a summer workshop and a joint depository for both spouses.

=== Awards ===
- 1981 Sonderpreis, Glaskunst '81, Kassel
- 1991 Gold Award, Cristalnacht Project, The American Interfaith Institute, Philadelphia, US
- 1985 JAC Art Exhibitions '85, New York
- 1992 Kanazawa '92, Grand Prize, Kanazawa, Japan

== Work ==
Dana Zámečníková worked briefly as a set designer (Amphitryon, National Theatre, 1972–1973), designed painted furniture, children's toys, information signs, interiors and exhibition concepts. She is the author of a television cartoon for children. The essence of her thinking is working with space—first as a game inside the object, then inside and outside the object, and finally integrating the object into the space. As an architect, she is primarily interested in the space created by human activity and the objects that contribute to its character. It is not about the order and hierarchy of space oriented towards function, but rather the involvement of every detail that co-creates the atmosphere. Detail is not a peripheral element in her work, but one that changes the situation, character and meaning of the whole.

Until the mid-1980s, she made mostly small spatial paintings enclosed in boxes, with intricately coded scenes of model stories (Theatre, 1980, Mechanical Man, 1981, Two Cats, 1984, Levitation, 1985). She creates the illusion of spatial depth by drawing on several panes of glass in a succession. Her painting is characterized by simplicity to the point of being sign-like, offering an idea of the landscape rather than an image of it. With her humour, she introduces the principle of human spontaneity, exuberance and fantasy into a limited order. Her intimate works were at first poetic puns—a kind of personal kaleidoscope, created for the pleasure of the eye and soul (With a Cheetah, 1987, With a Bustle, 1987).

Later, she gradually enlarged the formats of her drawings, which were given socially critical meanings, letting them move freely from framing into space and often supplementing them with real objects, which leave it up to the observer to determine where reality begins and ends. The resulting image was first created by composing drawings on glass arranged in a row, but she gradually created more spatially complicated sculptures by joining the glass at different angles and by drawing the surrounding space into play through diagonal deployment. The artist uses computer scans to process photographs, paintings, prints or reproductions of works to create illusory to surreal assemblages. Her works often depict existential situations (The Scream, 1990) and mix memories with visual fantasy.

Dana Zámečníková's dominant artistic technique is cut flat and laid glass or plexiglass, cold decorated with painting, enamels, silkscreen, sandblasting or etching, which she combines in multi-layered spatial plans and installations. Thanks to her studies in stage design, she has brought narrative elements of "wild painting" to glass, with roots in the legacy of Pop art. The uniqueness of her work among glass artists is based on imaginative figuration. Some of the things Dana Zámečníková evokes in her work are reminiscent of circuses, fairy tales, theatre, diaries, infinity, magic, or, as in Venice, of overseas voyages, glitz, misery, the swarming of human beings, luxury and poverty. Her drawings depict colourful, defiant courtesans in high boots, Jews with yellow caps, woven pillows, strange tassels and, proverbially, the smell of canals. Zámečníková is interested in the meaning and spatial context of the stories she depicts or re-creates (White Bride, Black Madonna, 1998). Her installations consist of glass panes of unequal shape, size and inclination arranged in space, on which colourful drawings and paintings are recorded as fragments of experiences, ideas and impressions. In addition to expressive painting, her works are influenced by the rhythm of movements, interpenetration, overlapping, mirroring and the appearance and disappearance of details when changing the point of view. In her spatial installations, she uses the optical properties of glass and the reflection of the surrounding space, which mix with the painted image and contribute to the final effect.

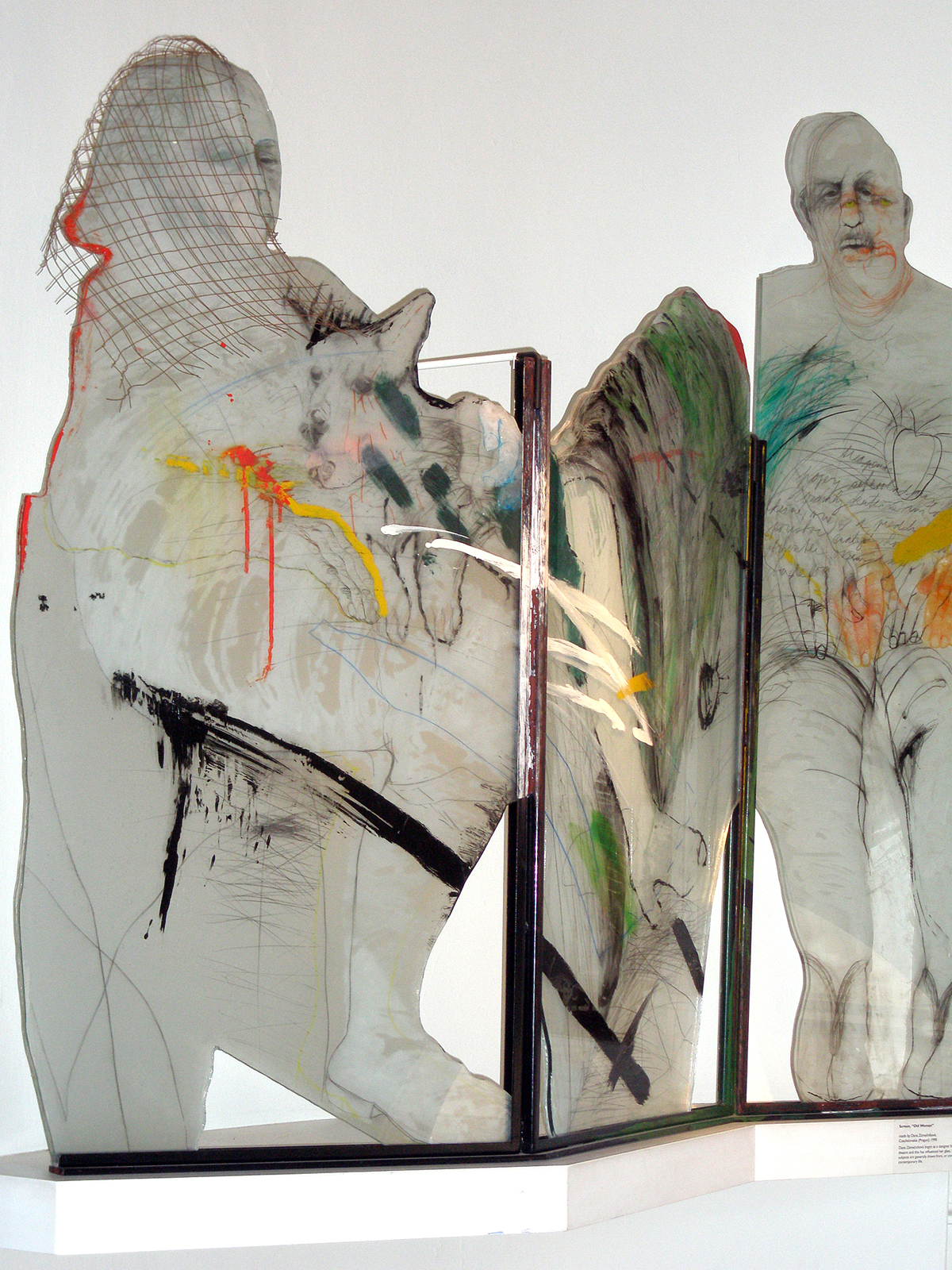
Divided World, Victoria & Albert Museum, London 1990

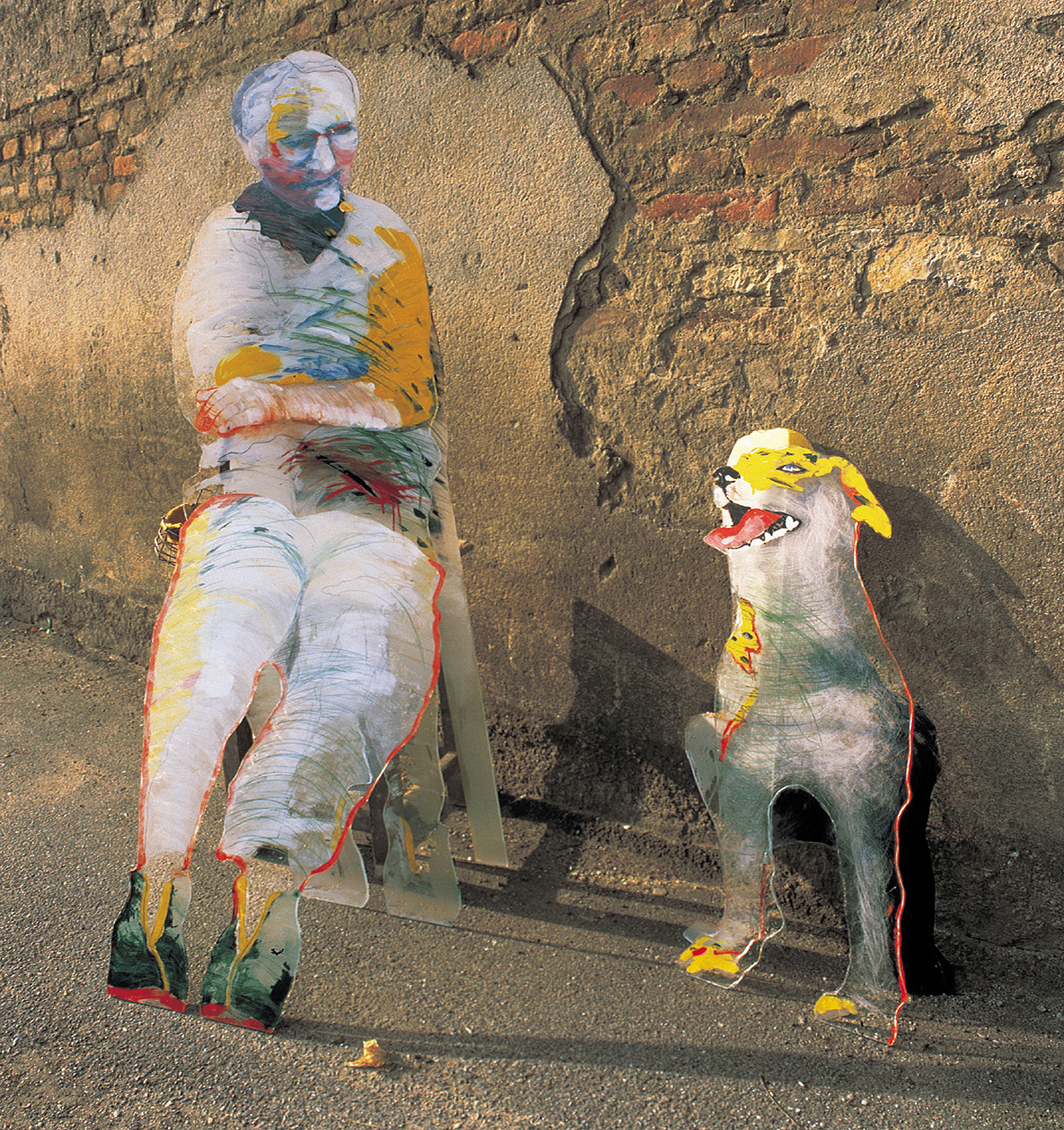
Conversation with a Dog, 1992

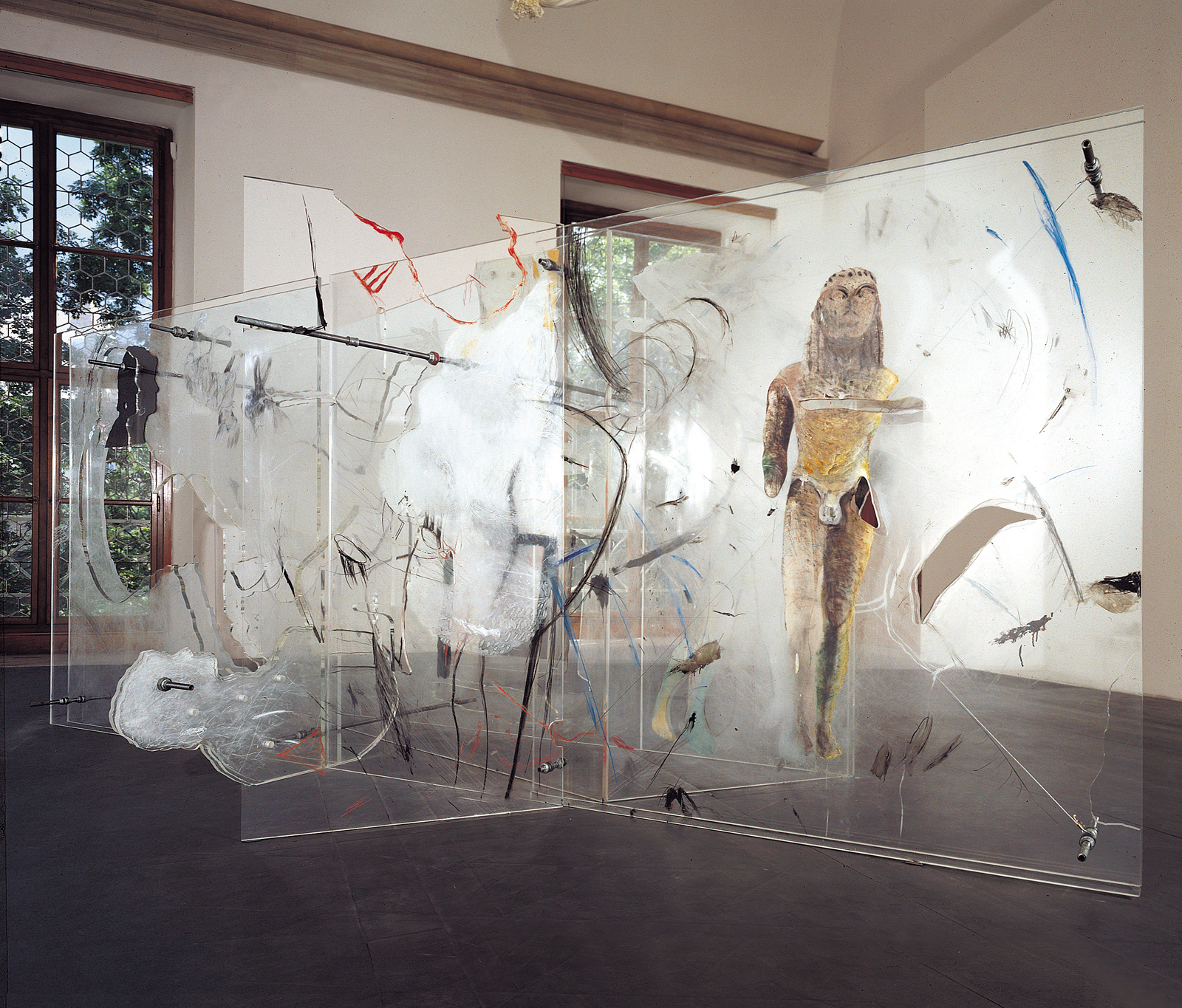
Without Saying a Word, Prague Castle 1995

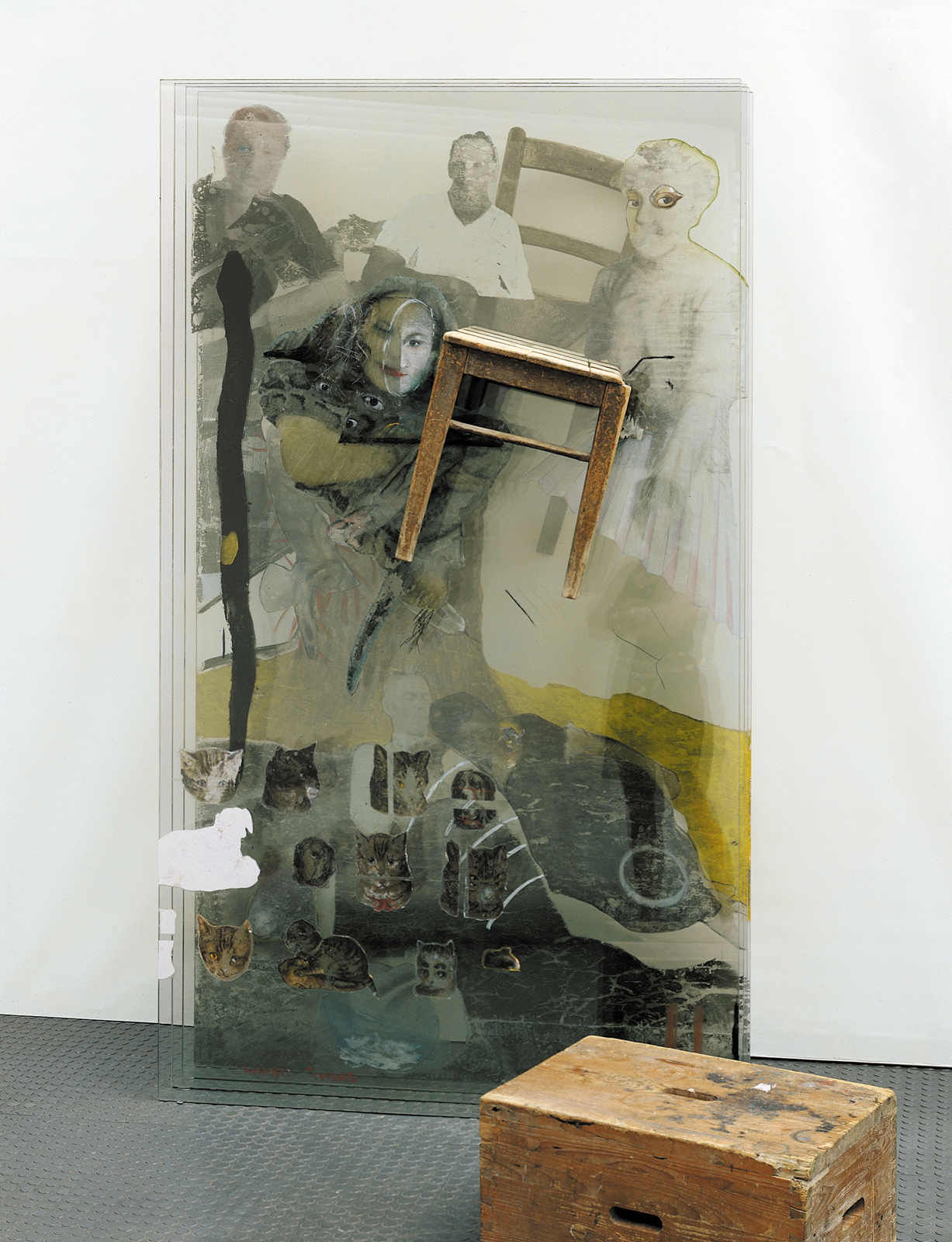
My Family, 1997

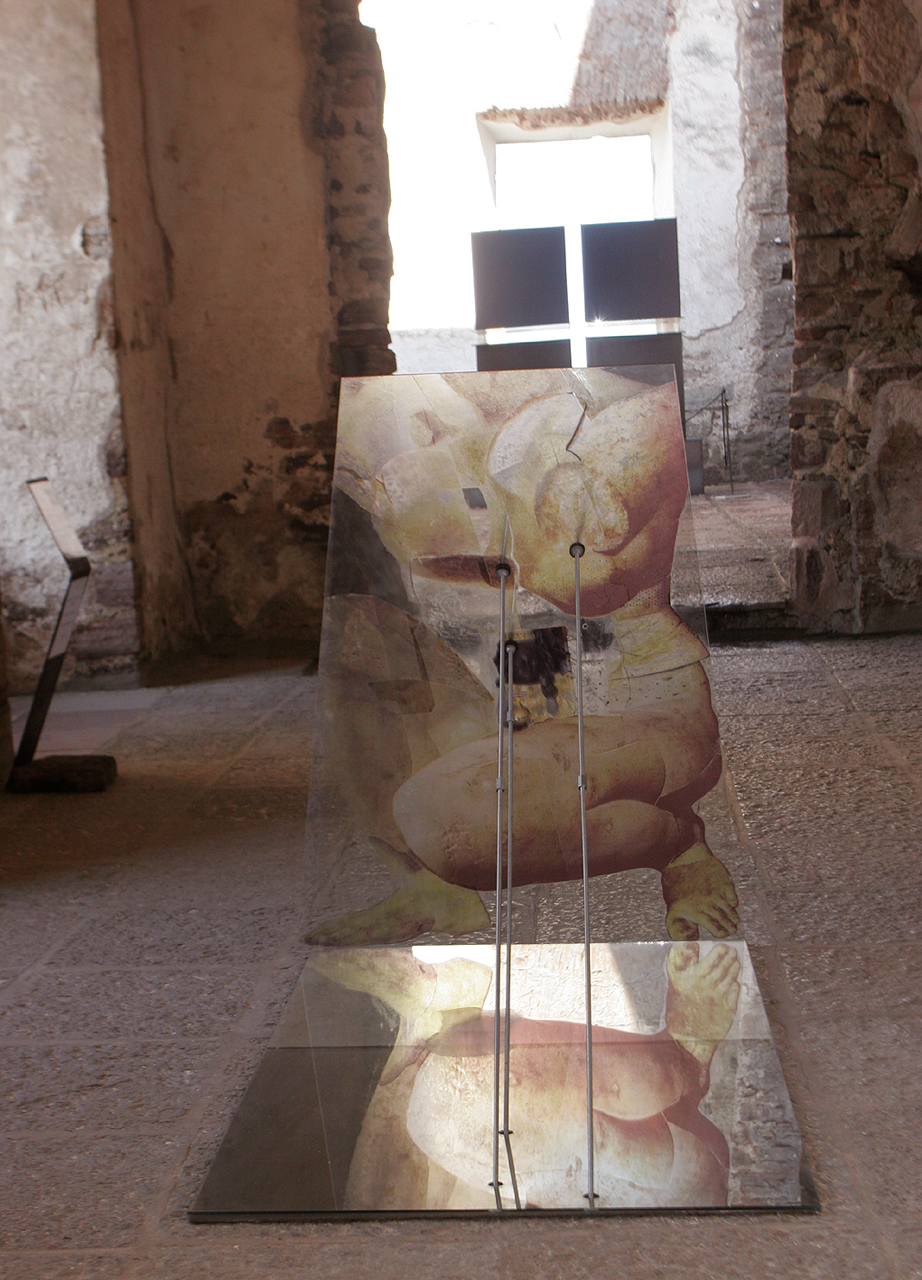
Woman Man, Borgholm, 2005

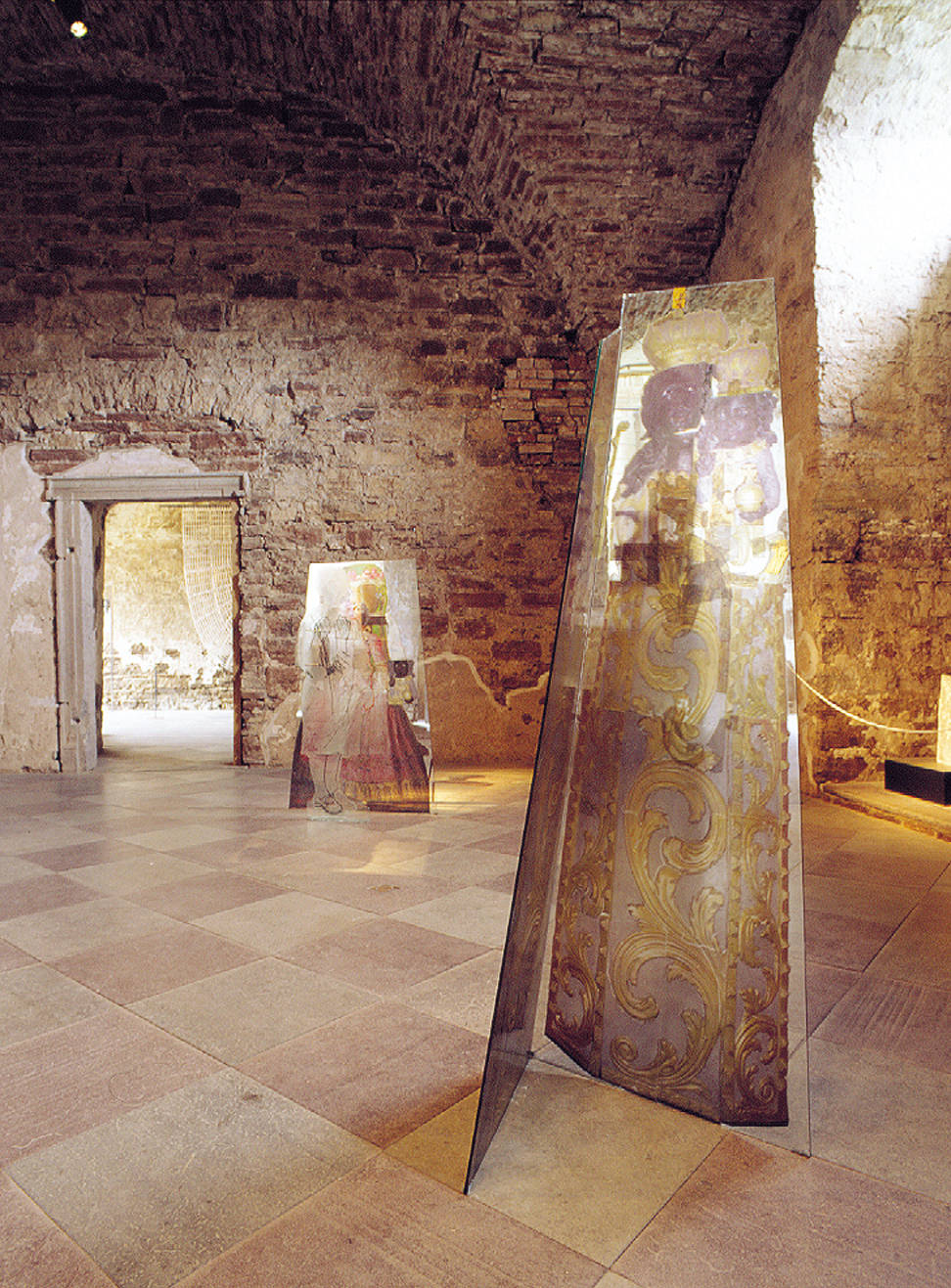
Black Madonna, Borgholm 2005

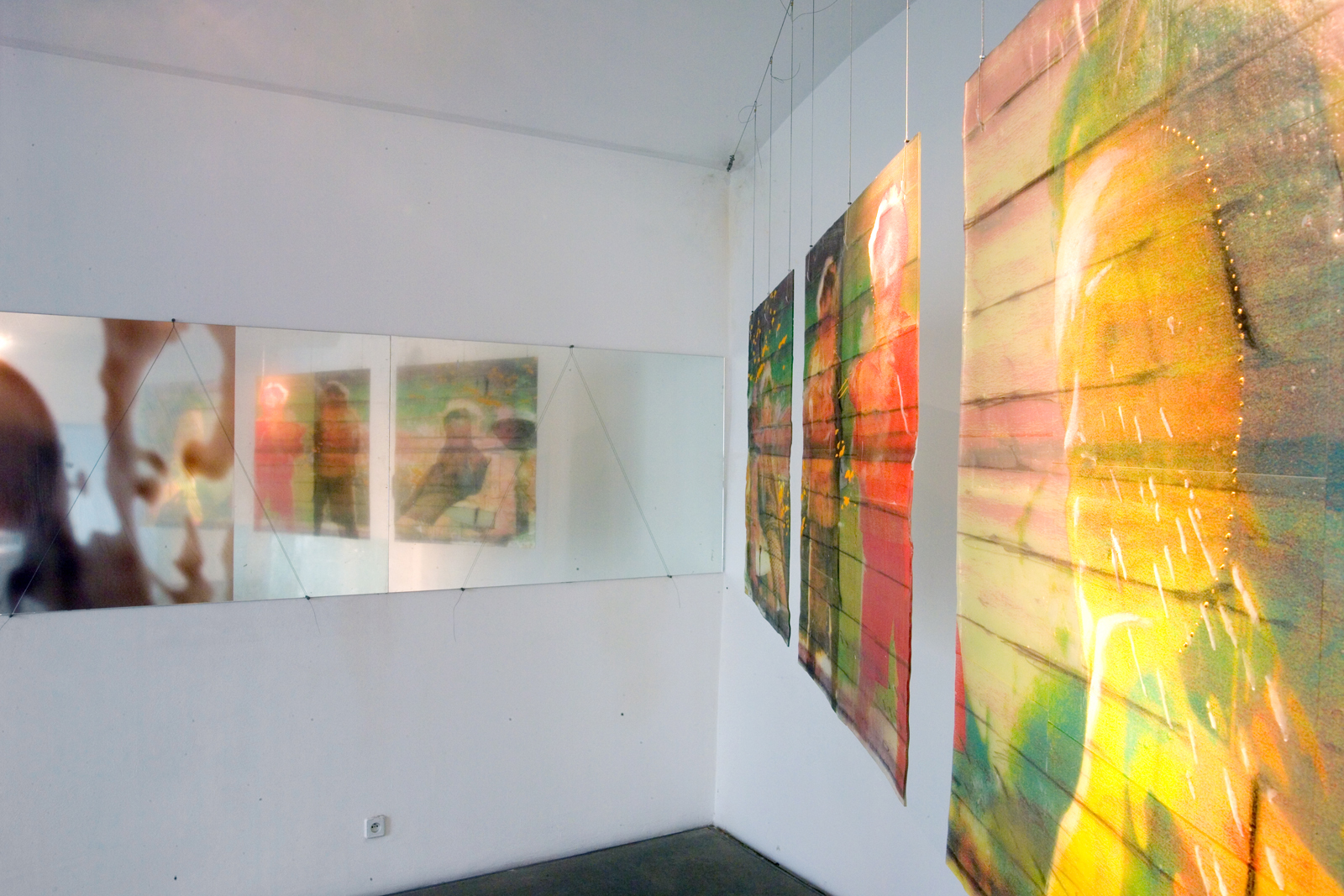
From Family Album, Museum Kampa, Prague 2005

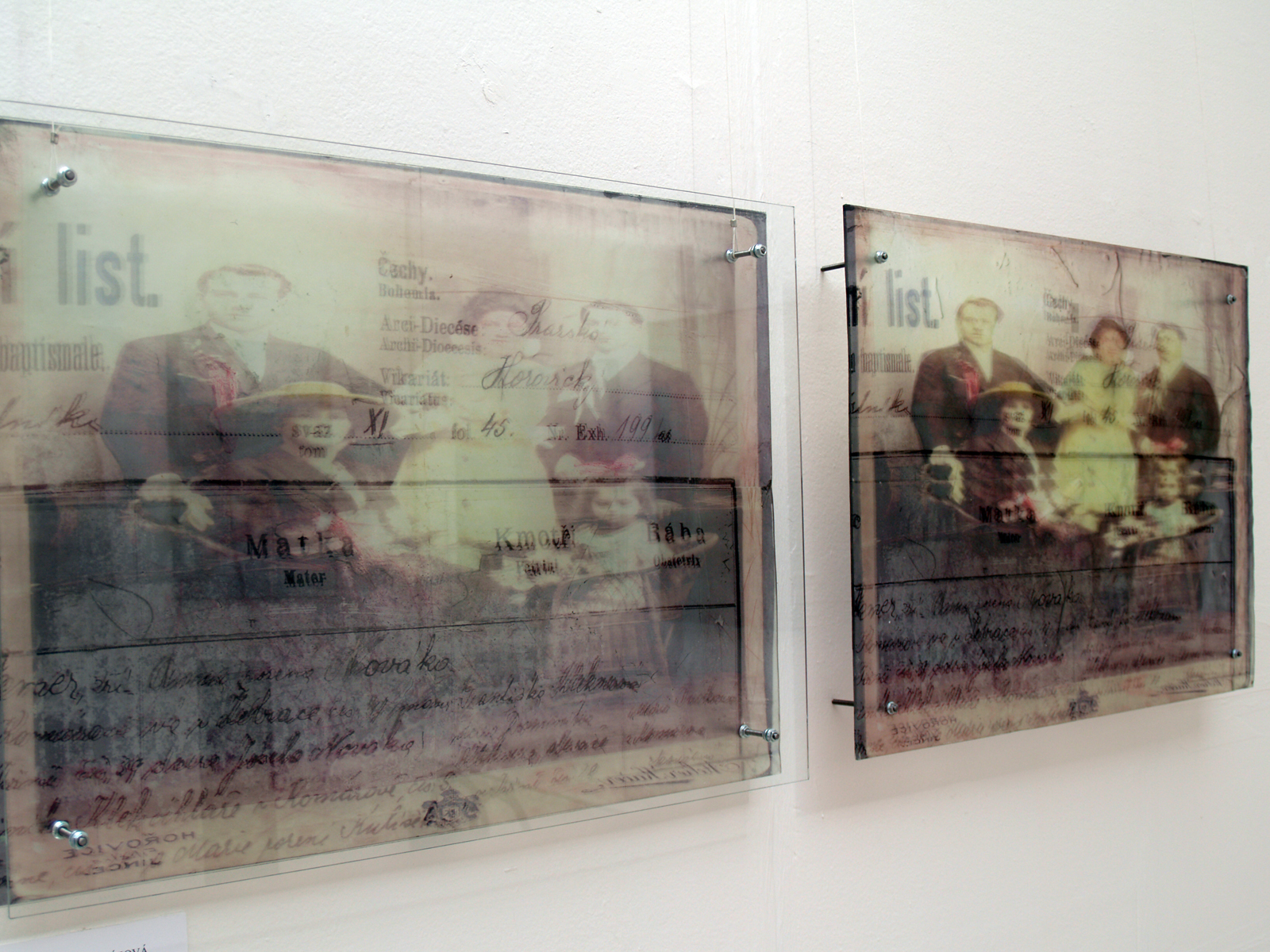
Wedding, 2004

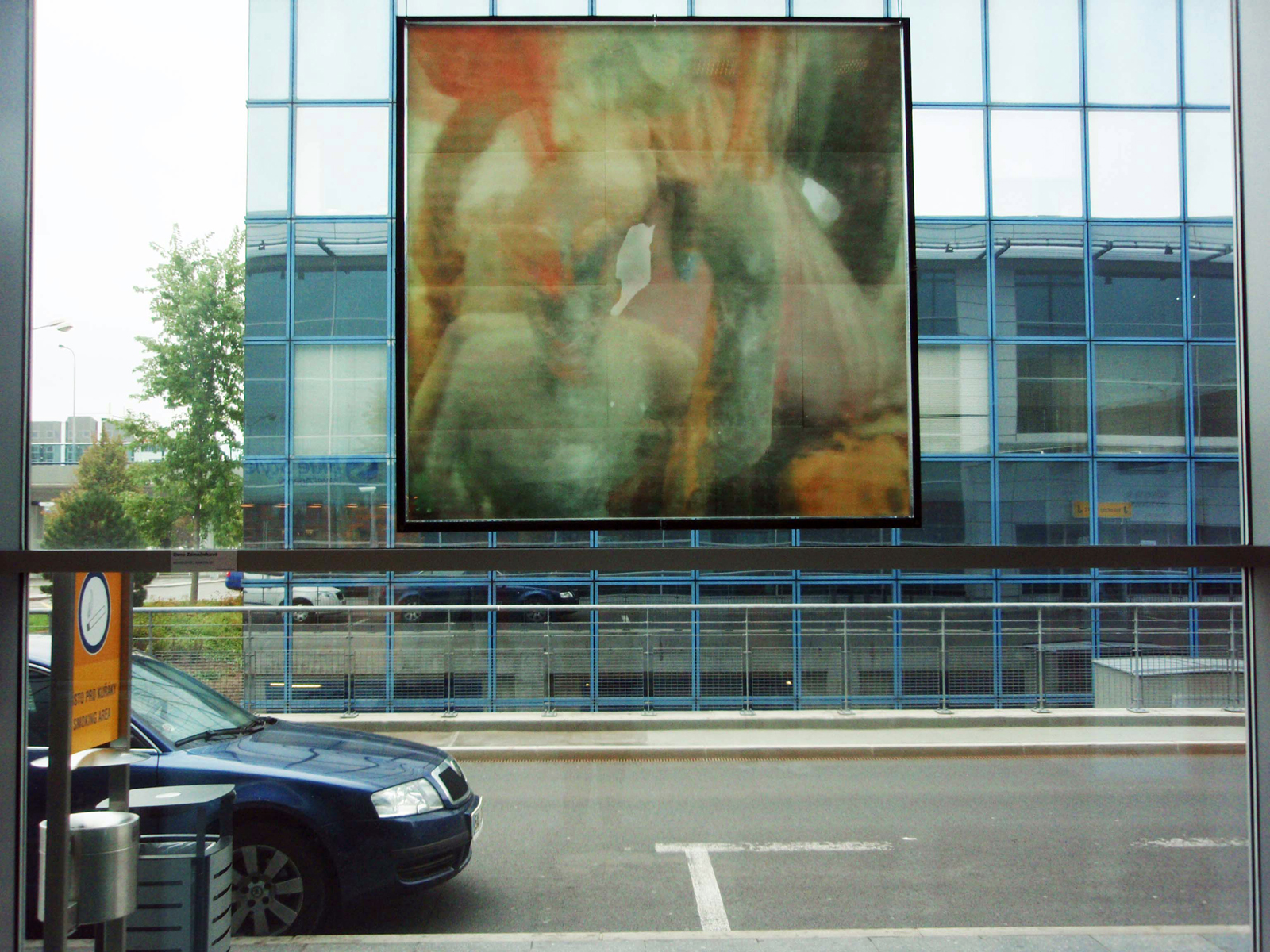
Bear Still Life, Prague Airport, 2008

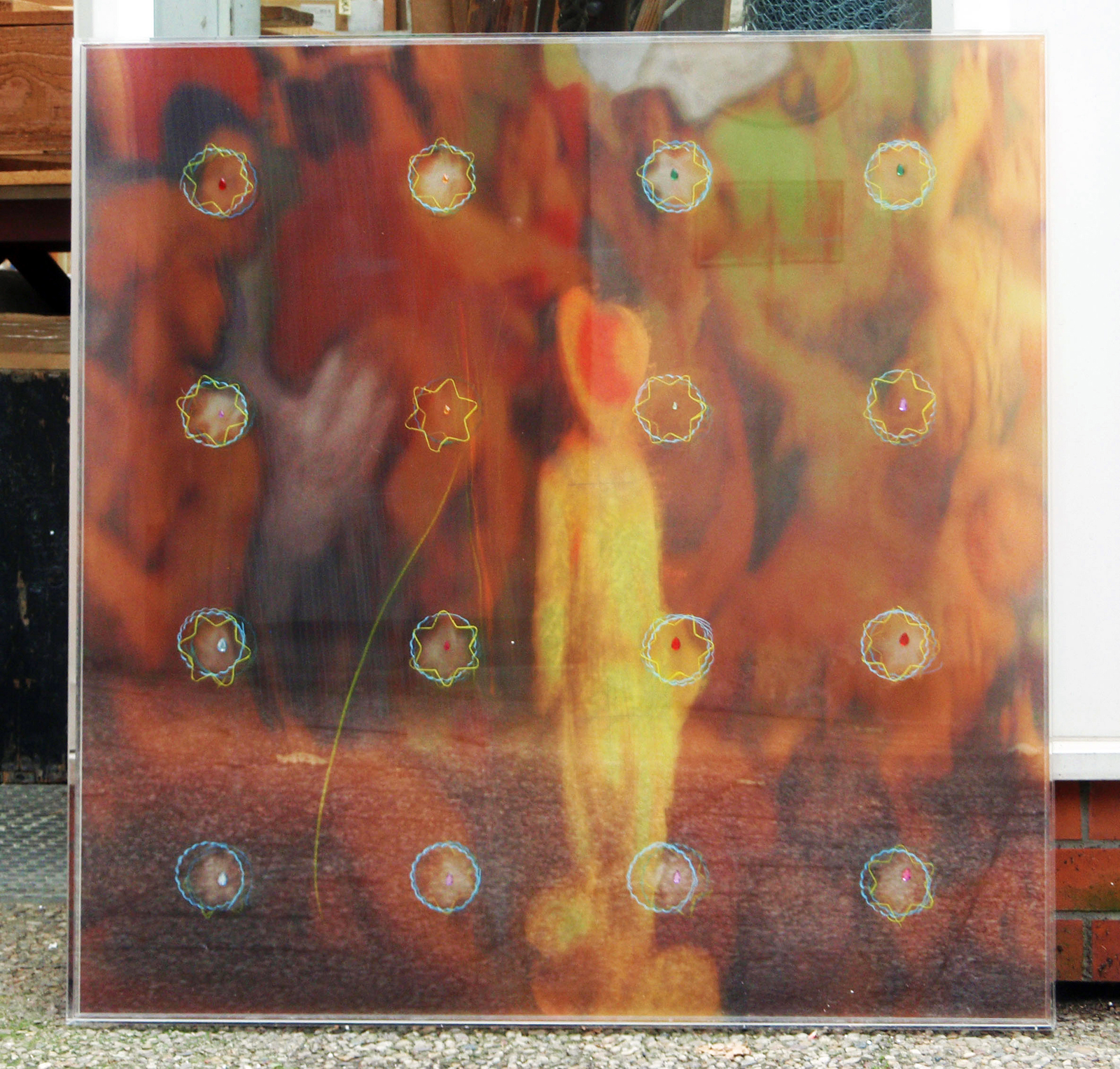
Dream, Florence, 2008

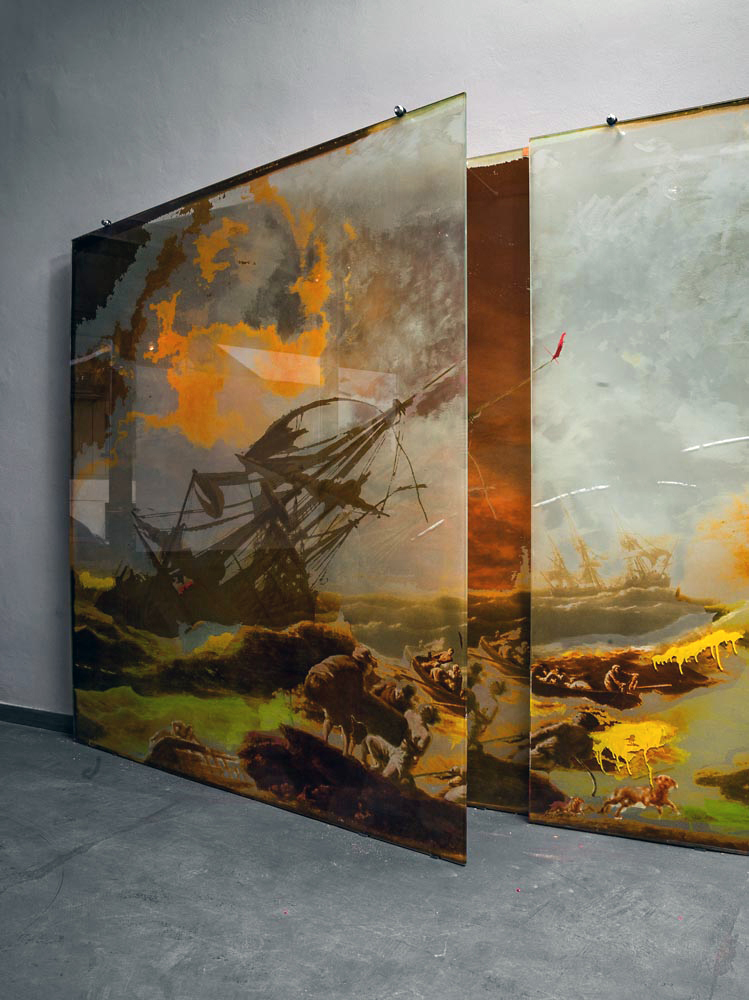
Storm, Kuzebauch Gallery, Prague (1) 2011

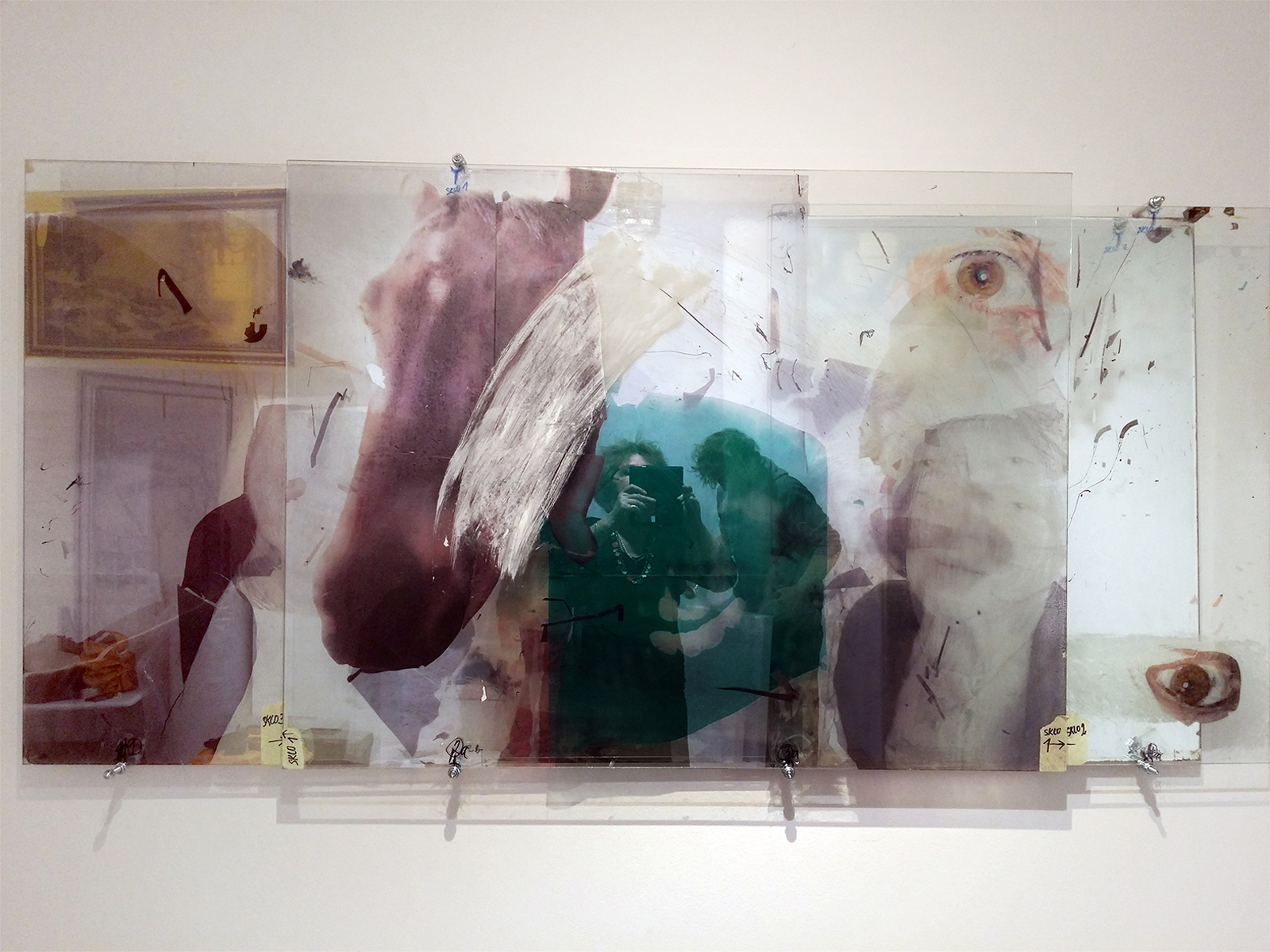
My Family, DSC Gallery, Prague, 2015

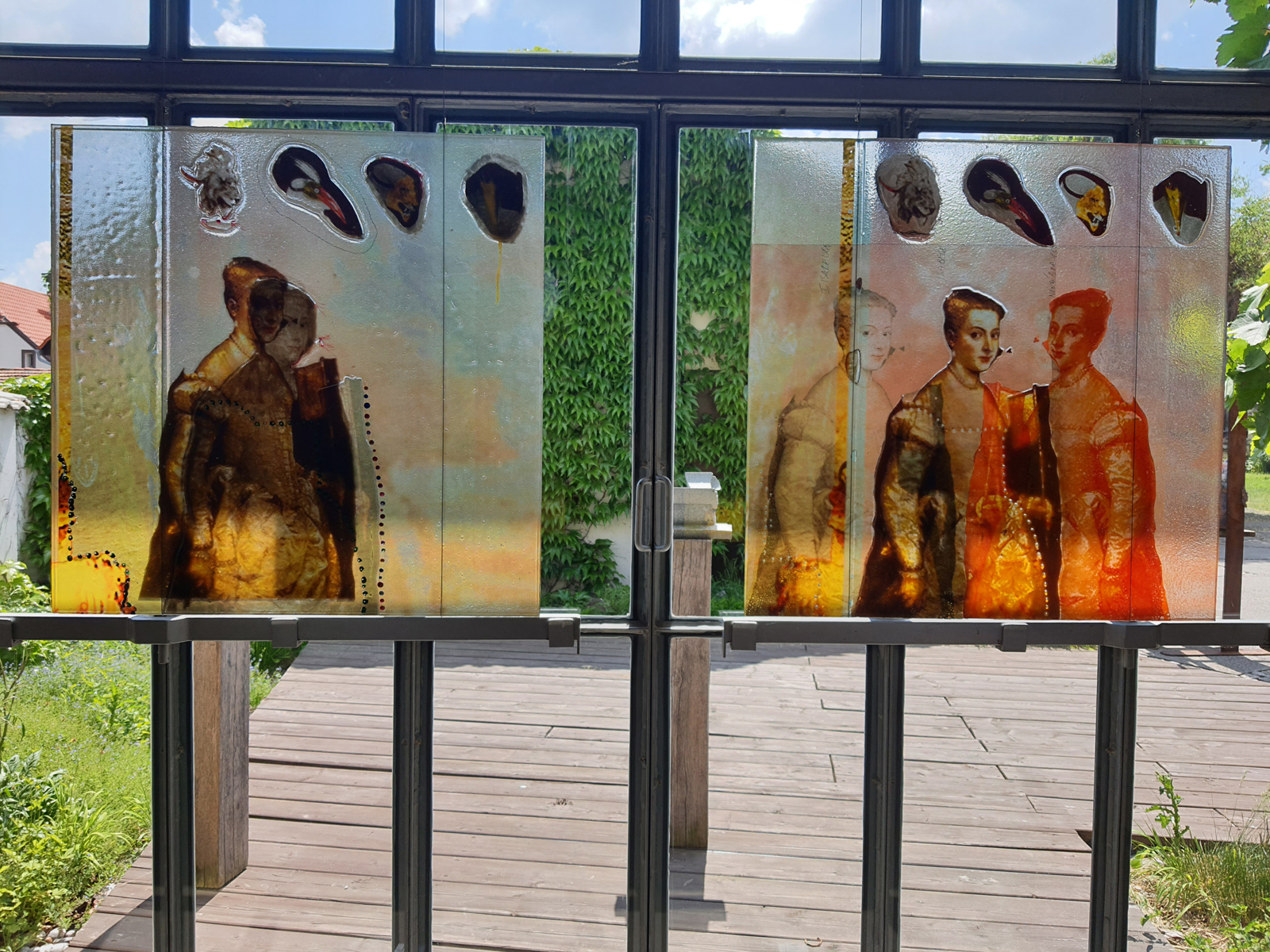
Isabelle, Svatoš Gallery, Kostelec nad Černými lesy 2021

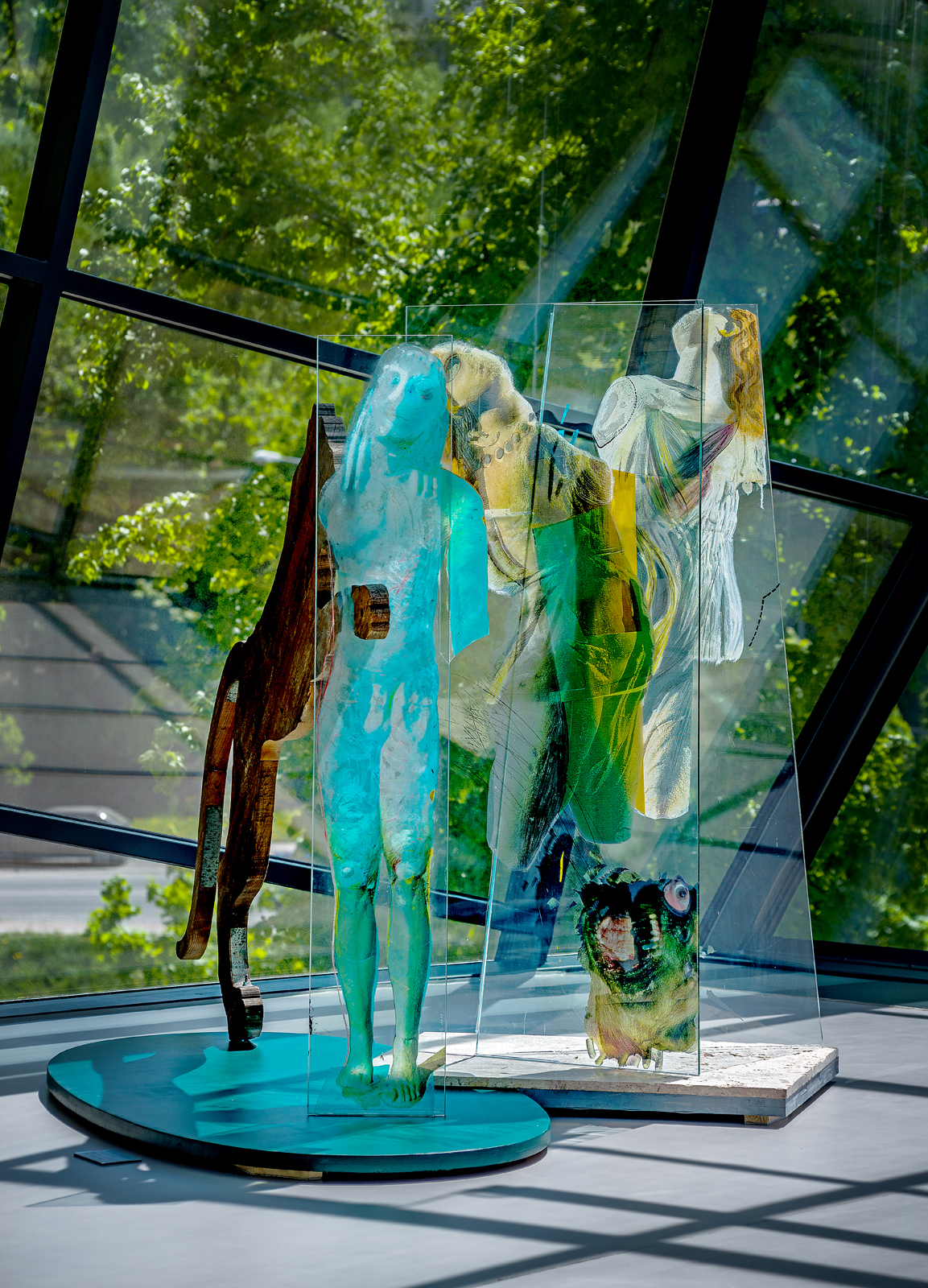
Installation, Museum of Glass and Jewellery in Jablonec nad Nisuo, 2022

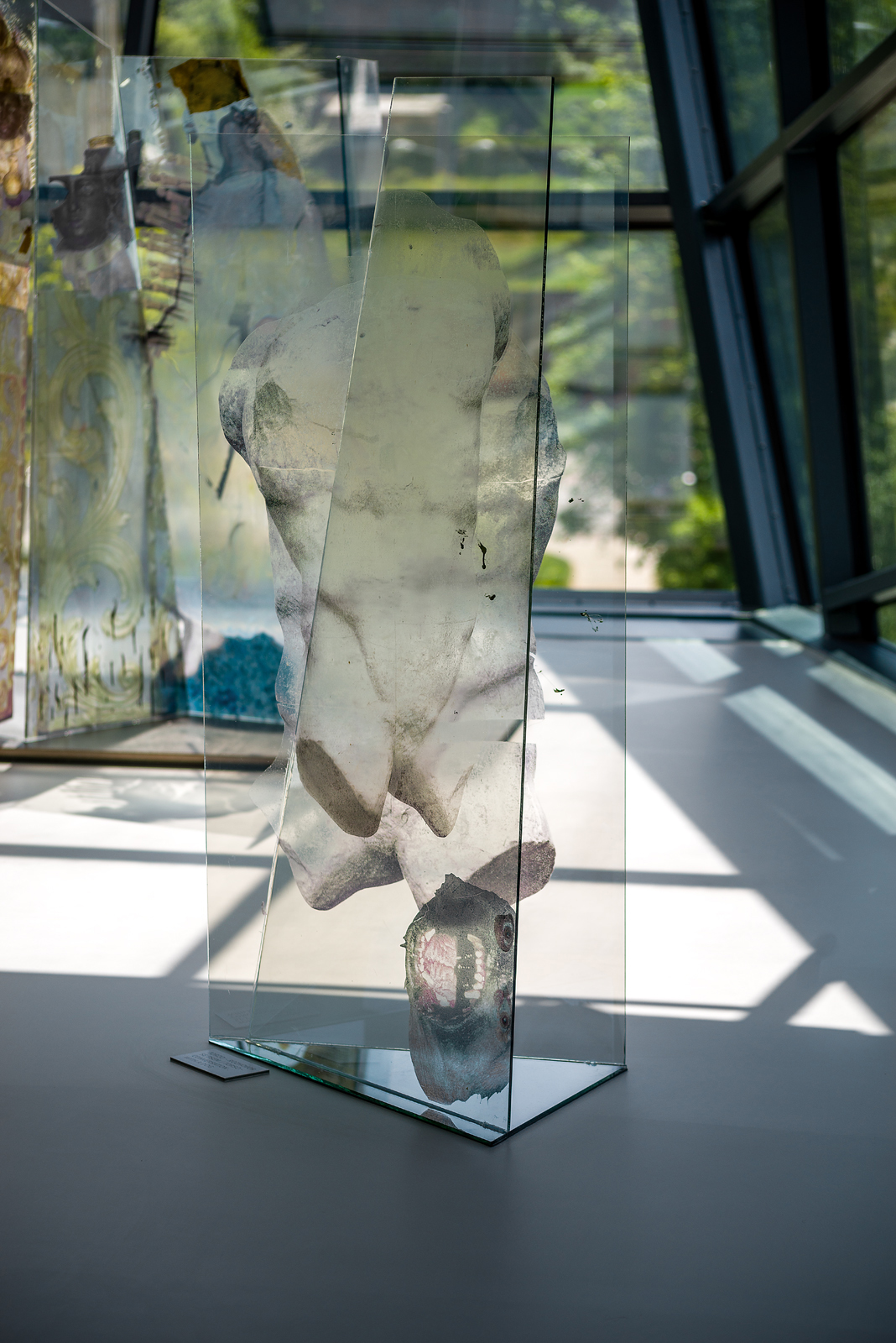
Installation, Museum of Glass and Jewellery in Jablonec nad Nisou, 2022

=== Representation in collections ===
- Corning Museum of Glass, New York, Corning Headquarters, permanent exhibition
- Museum of Modern Art (MOMA), New York
- American Craft Museum, New York
- Fine Arts Museums, San Francisco
- Contemporary Decorative Arts, Museum of Fine Arts Boston, US
- Lowe Art Museum, Miami
- Mint Museum, NC, US
- Museum of Decorative Arts in Prague
- Moravian Gallery in Brno
- Victoria and Albert Museum, London
- Musée des Arts décoratifs, Palais du Louvre, Paris
- Musée des Arts décoratifs, Lausanne
- Musée des Beaux Arts et de la Ceramique, Rouen
- Musée-Atelier du Verre, Sars-Poteries
- Hokkaido Museum of Modern Arts, Sapporo
- The Yokohama City Museum, Yokohama
- Toyama City Institute of Glass Art
- Koganezaki Glass Museum
- Kanazawa City Museum
- Niijima Museum
- Grand Crystal Museum, Tai Pei
- Württembergisches Landesmuseum, Stuttgart
- Glasmuseum Ebeltoft
- Glasmuseum Frauenau
- Glasmuseum Bärnbach
- Mönchenhaus, Museum Goslar
- Badisches Landesmuseum Karlsruhe
- Broadfield House Glass Museum, Kingswinford
- Gallery of the City of Prague, Prague
- North Bohemian Museum Liberec
- Museum of Glass and Jewellery Jablonec nad Nisou
- East Bohemia Museum Pardubice
- The Art Gallery of Western Australia, Perth
- Victoria Museum, Melbourne
- Auckland Museum, New Zealand
- Toledo Museum of Art, Ohio
- Pilchuck School Collection, Stanwood
- The JB Speed Art Museum, Louisville
- Private Collections

For an overview see

=== Realisations ===
- 1976 Glass partition wall 200 × 600 cm, Computer Centre Pilsen (with Karel Vaňura and Marian Karel)
- 1978 Glass panel 250 × 200 cm, sandblasted glass, Antique shop Prague (with Karel Vaňura)
- 1984 Glass panels 200 × 160 cm, 220 × 160 cm, sandblasted and painted glass, Pizzeria Praha (with Karel Vaňura and Marian Karel)
- 1988 Glass sculpture, Czech pavilon, 43rd Biennale di Venezia
- 1992 Glasswall, The WorldBank, Washington D.C., US
- 1993 Theatrum mundi, Corning Museum of Glass, New York
- 2000/2002 architectural collaboration on the reconstruction of Kampa Museum, Prague
- 2002 Glass Wall (5 x 3 m), Mercedes Administration Building in Prague
- 2007 Acrylic Glass Wall (4 x 2 m), Palladium, Prague
- 2007 Sheraton Tacoma Hotel, WA, US
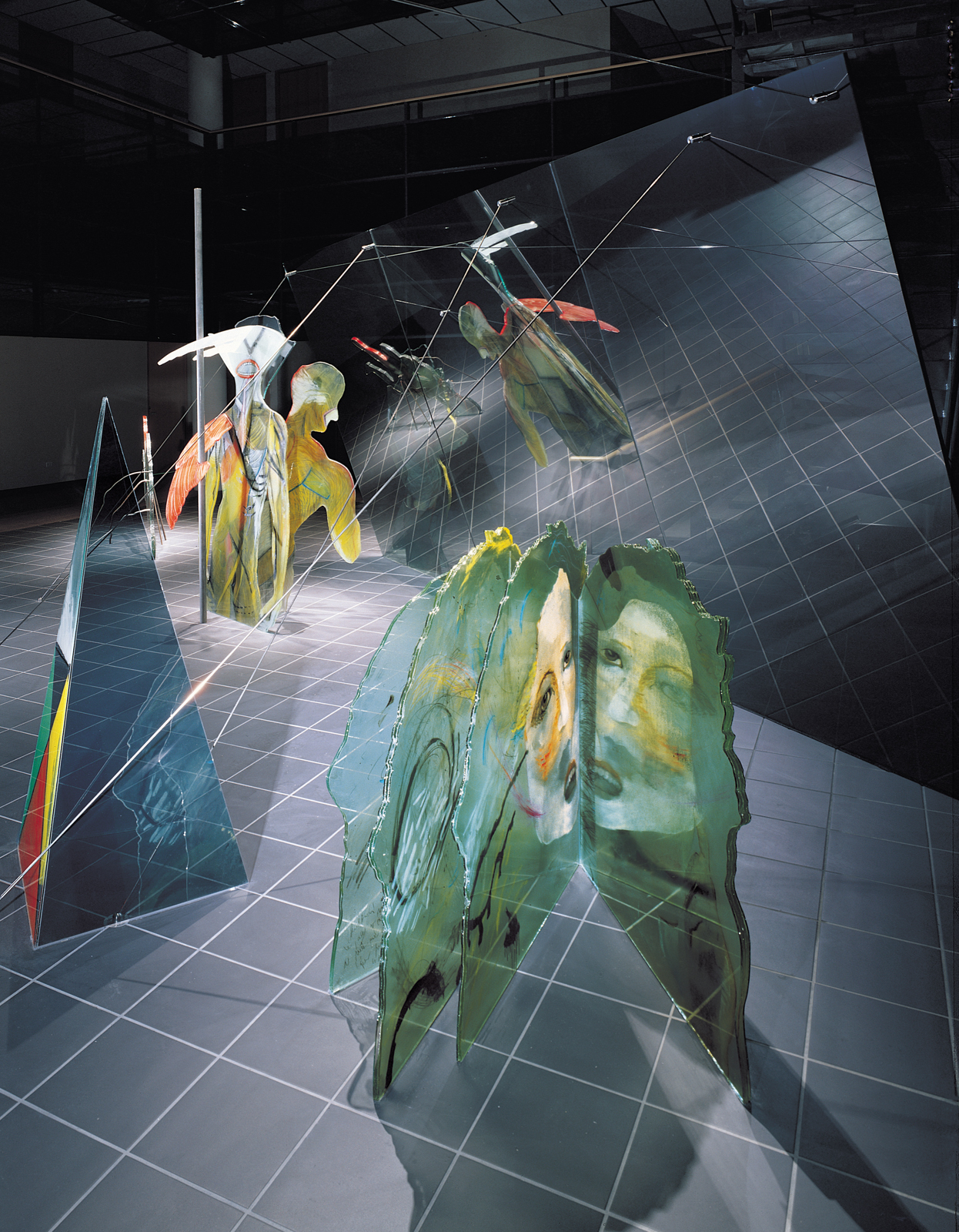
Theatrum Mundi', Corning HDQ (3), 1992–1993

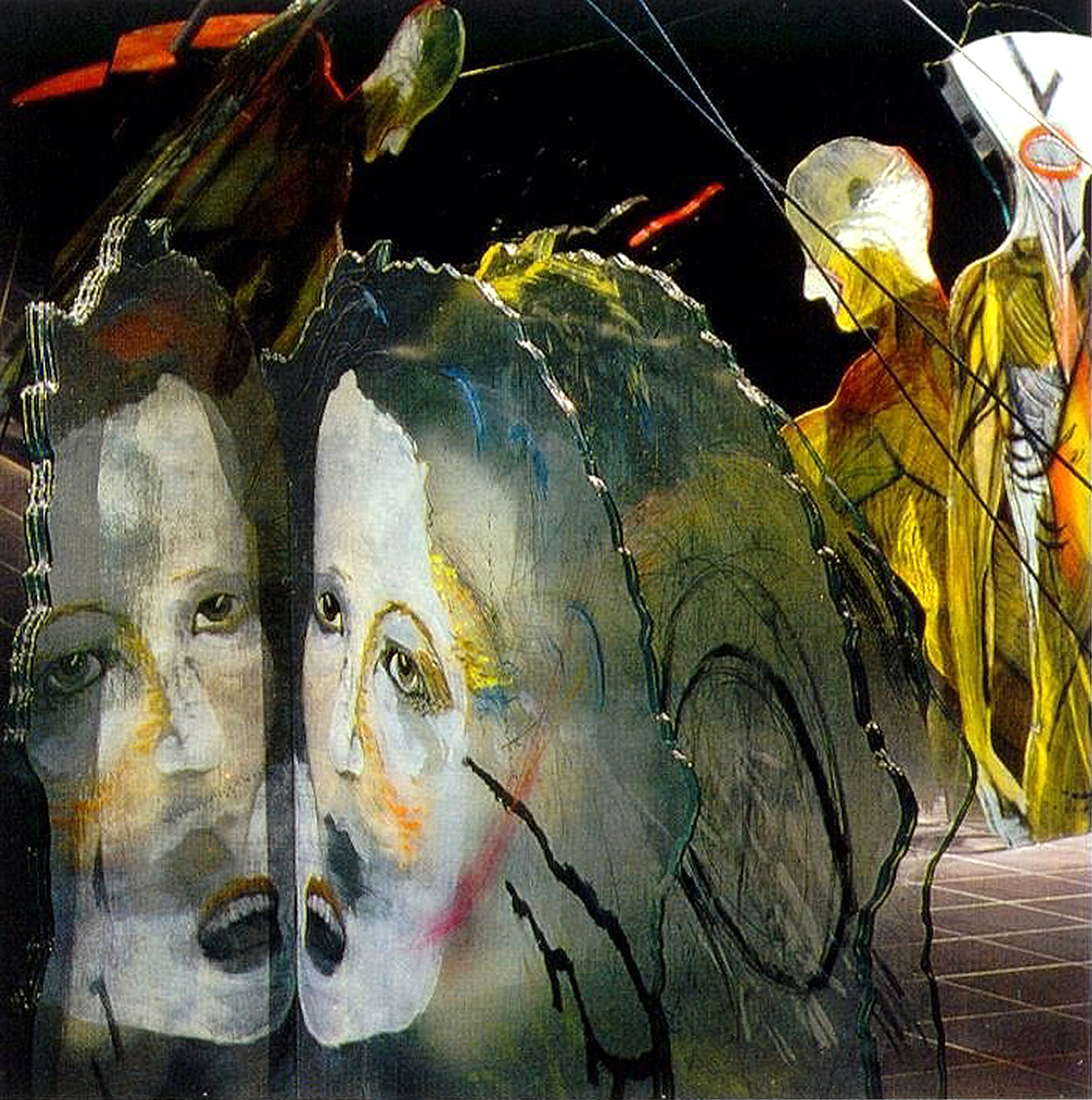
Theatrum Mundi, Corning HDQ (1) 1992–1993

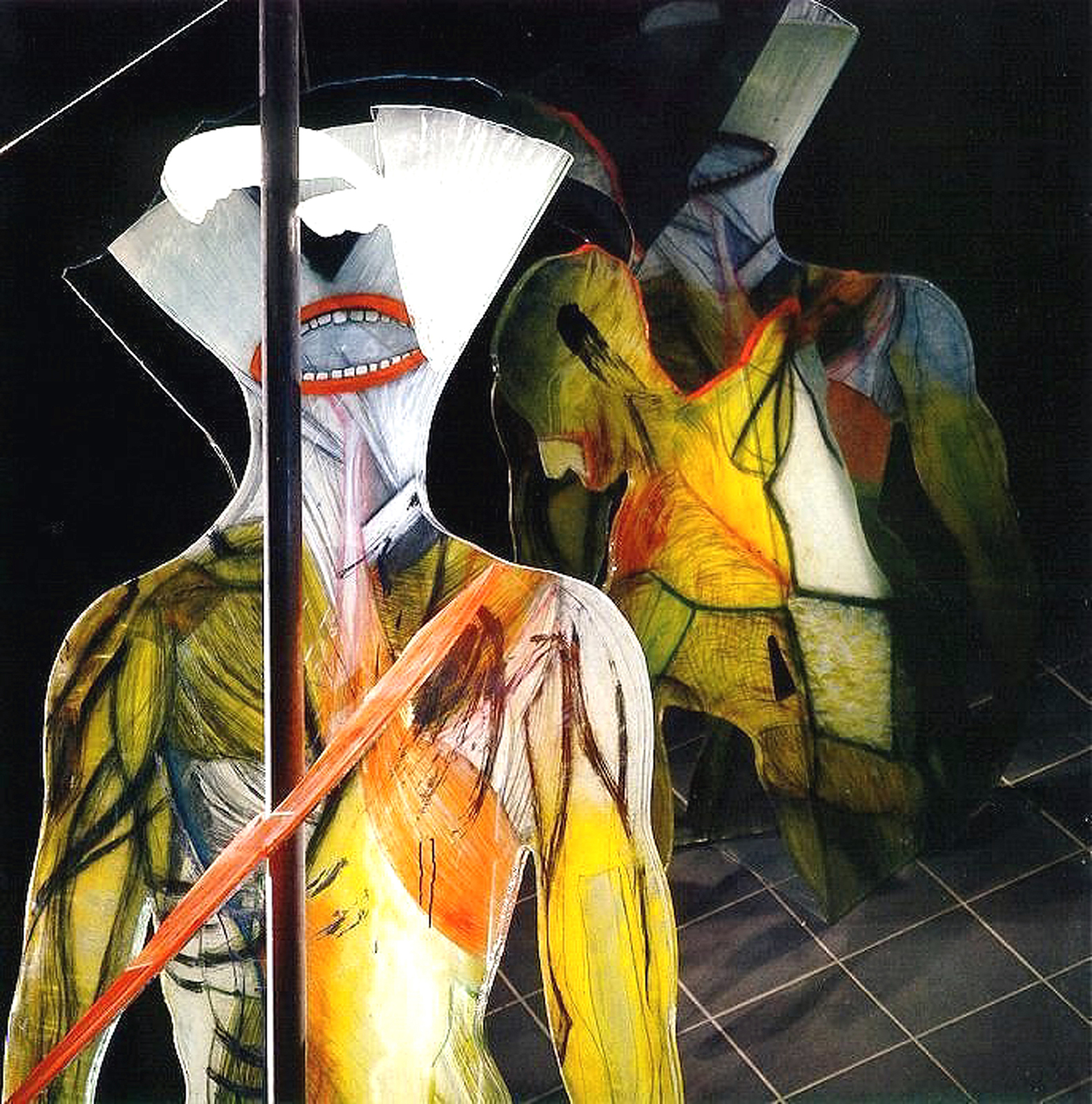
Theatrum Mundi, Corning HDQ (2) 1992–1993

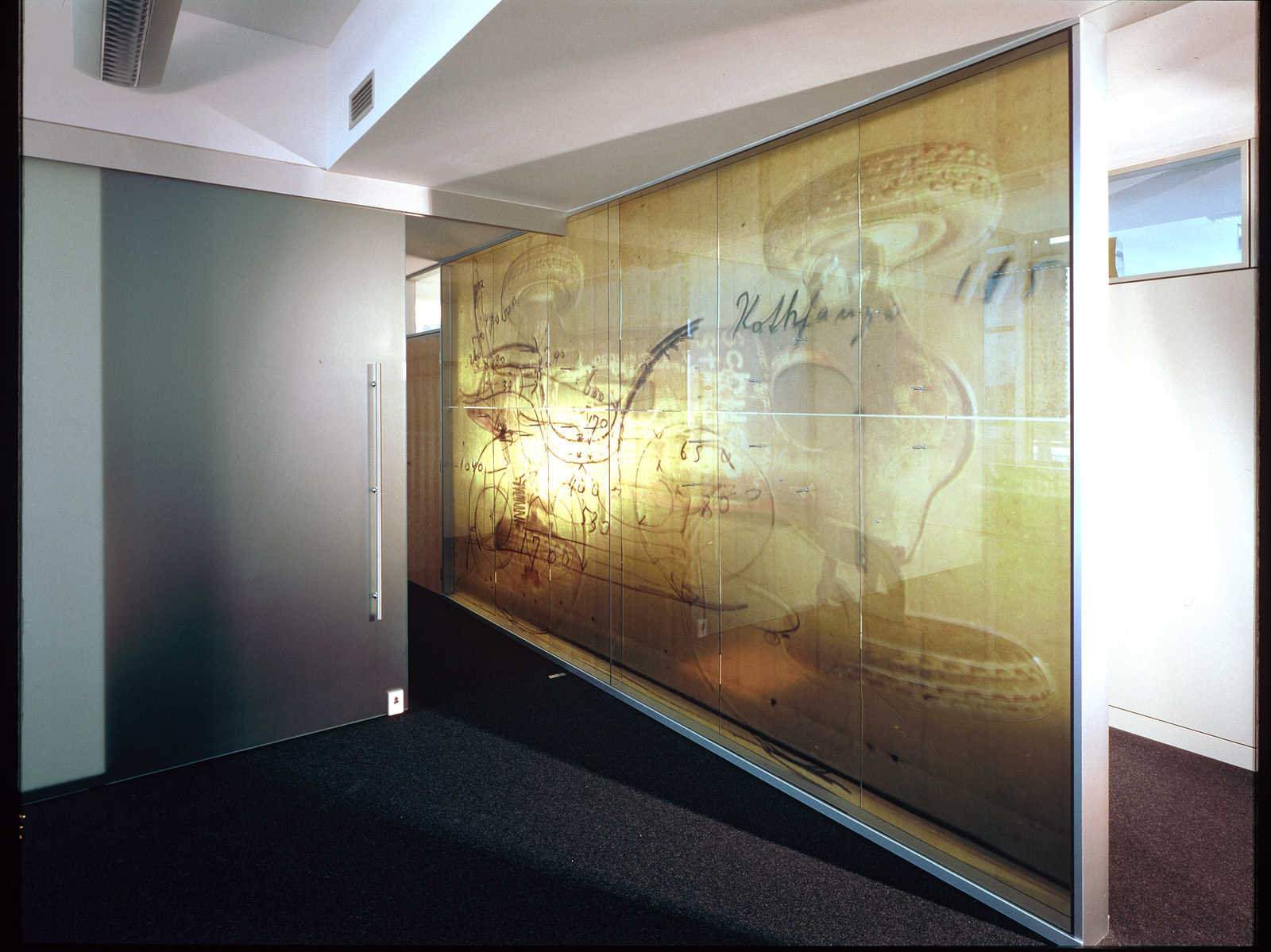
Glass Wall, Mercedes HDQ, Prague 2002

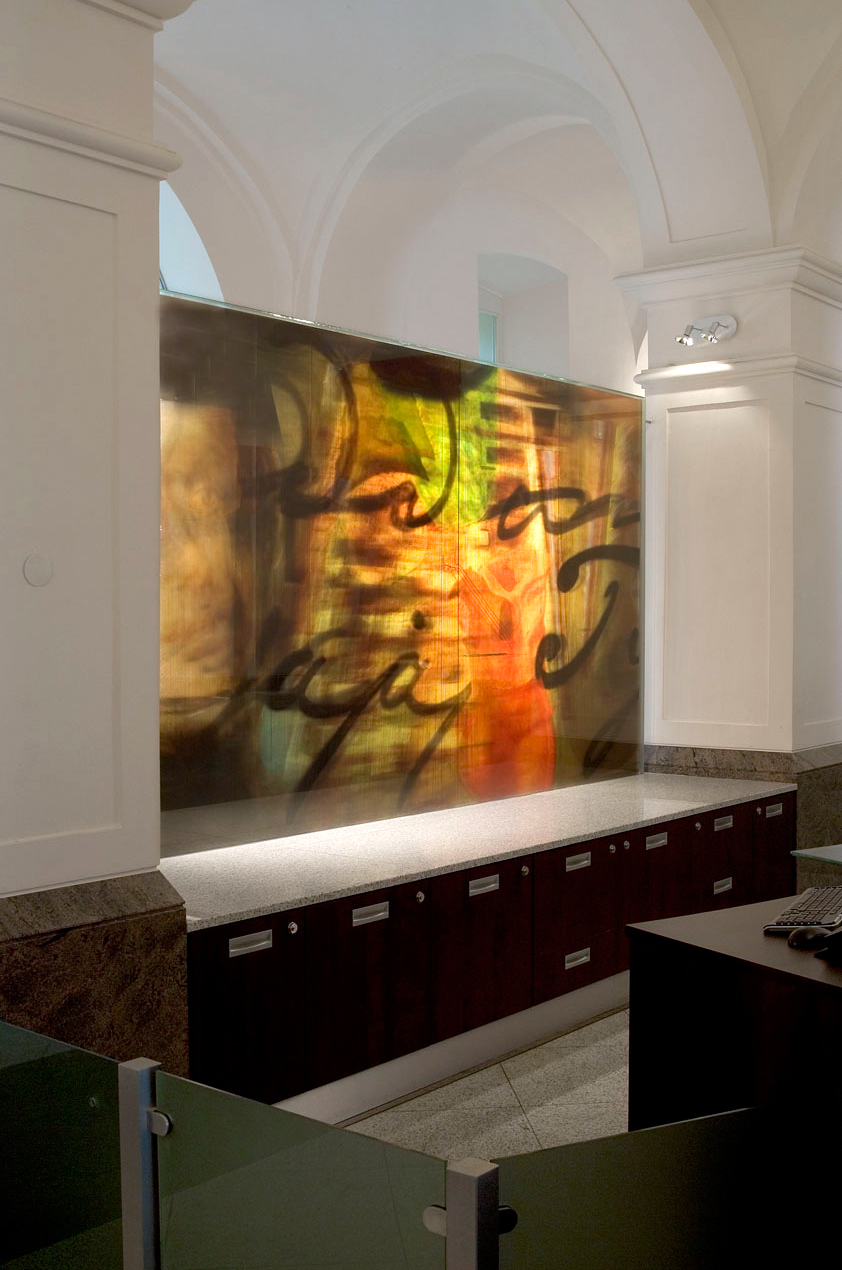
Acrylic Glass Wall, Palladium, Prague 2008

=== Exhibitions ===
==== Authors (selection) ====
- 1980 Objekty, Divadlo v Nerudovce / Objects, Theatre in Nerudovka, Prague
- 1981 Galerie Karolina, Prague
- 1982 Jacques Baruch Gallery, Chicago (with M. Karel, O. Plíva, A. Vašíček, Y. Zoritschak)
- 1984 Heller Gallery, New York
- 1985 Galerie Gottschalk-Betz, Frankfurt am Main
- 1986 Galerie „R“, Hamburg, Heller Gallery, New York
- 1987 Skleněné prostory, Výstavní síň Semaforu / Glass Spaces, Semafor Exhibition Hall, Prague, Heller Gallery, New York
- 1988 Clara Scremini Gallery, Paris (with Marian Karel)
- 1989 Heller Gallery, New York (with Marian Karel)
- 1990 Galerie Sanske, Zürich (with M. Karel, S. Libenský, J. Brychtová)
- 1990/1991 Art Frankfurt Kunstmesse (with Marian Karel, Stanislav Libenský, Jaroslava Brychtová), Frankfurt am Main, Clara Scremini Gallery, Paris
- 1991 Heller Gallery, New York
- 1991 Marian Karel and Dana Zámečníková, Nakama Gallery, Tokyo
- 1992 San Francisco State University, Installation Exhibition, San Francisco
- 1992 Marian Karel and Dana Zámečníková, Nakama Gallery, Tokyo
- 1994 Za zrcadlem, / Behind the Mirror, Nová síň Gallery, Prague
- 1995 Heller Gallery, New York City
- 1996 Maurine Littleton Gallery, Washington
- 1998 Galerie na Jánském Vršku, Prague
- 2000 Heller Gallery, New York City
- 2001/2002 Tabula smaragdina, Academy of Arts and Crafts, Prague
- 2002 Bethlehem Chapel, Pokorná Gallery, Prague
- 2003 Nakama Gallery, Tokyo
- 2005 Museum Kampa - Jan and Meda Mládek Foundation, Prague
- 2007 Pokorná Gallery, Prague
- 2011 Italian Institute, Pokorná Gallery, Prague Art Festival
- 2013 Erwin Eisch, Dana Zámečníková, pARTner D-CZ, Furth im Wald
- 2014 Pokorná Gallery, Prague
- 2015 Magna Gallery, Ostrava
- 2017 Střepy znamenají štěstí / Shards mean happiness, Centre of Glass Art, Huť František, Sázava
- 2022 Země v oblacích / Earth in the Clouds, Museum of Glass and Jewellery in Jablonec nad Nisou

==== Collective (selection) ====
- 1980 Triennial of Cut Glass, Museum of Decorative Arts, Brno
- 1981 Czechoslovakian Glass 1350–1980, The Corning Museum of Glass
- 1981 Glaskunst 81, Orangerie, Kassel
- 1982 Exhibition of fifteen women artists, Municipal Cultural Centre, Dobříš
- 1982 Contemporary Czechoslovakian Glass, Jewelry and Sculpture, Foster/White Gallery, Seattle
- 1982 Prostor 1 / Space 1, Memorial of National Literature, Prague
- 1983 Skleněná plastika / Glass Sculpture, Brno House of Art
- 1983 Prostor 2 / Space 2, Veletržní palác, Prague
- 1984 Czechoslovak Glass '84: Art Glass Creation, Wallenstein Riding Hall, Prague
- 1985 Zweiter Coburger Glaspreis für moderne Glasgestaltung in Europa, Kunstsammlungen der Veste Coburg, Coburg, World Glass Now, Hokkaido, MOMA, Sapporo
- 1986 Contemporary Czechoslovak Glass in Architecture, University of London, Institute of Education, Glynn Vivian Art Gallery, Swansea, The Billingham Art Gallery
- 1986 Prostor 3 / Space 3, water reservoir, Všemina
- 1986/198 Expressions en verre, Musée des Arts décoratifs, Lausanne
- 1987 Vidre d'art, Hivernacle Barcelona, Barcelona
- 1987/1988 Thirty Years of New Glass 1957–1987, The Corning Museum of Glass, Toledo Museum of Art
- 1988 Artistes verriers de Tchécoslovaquie, Galerie Transparence, Brussels, 43. Biennale di Venezia
- 1989/1990 Verres de Bohême: 1400–1989 chefs-d'œuvre des musées de Tchécoslovaquie, Musée des Arts décoratifs, Paris
- 1990 Cesty k postmoderně. Průzkum osmdesátých let / Paths to Postmodernity. A survey of the 1980s, Museum of Decorative Arts, Prague
- 1990 Glastec 90, Düsseldorf
- 1990/1991 Neues Glas in Europa: 50 Künstler - 50 konzepte / New Glass in Europe: 50 Artist - 50 Concepts, Museum Kunstpalast, Düsseldorf
- 1991 Contemporary glass, Yokohama Museum of Art
- 1991/1992 Nomades del Vidre, Barcelona
- 1991 Prague Glass Prize 91, Mánes, Prague
- 1994 Sklo 20. století / Glass of the 20th Century, East Bohemian Museum, Pardubice
- 1995 One Hundred Years of Bohemian Glass, Takasaki Museum of Art
- 1995 Space, Light, Glass (Brychtová, Libenský, Cigler, Kopecký, Karel, Zámečníková), Prague Castle Ballroom, Prague
- 1995, 1996/1997, 1998/1999, 1999/2000 Umělecká beseda, Mánes, Prague
- 1996 Czechoslovakian Glass, The Corning Museum of Glass, Corning
- 1996 Form Light Glass: Contemporary Glass from the Czech Republic, American Craft Museum, New York City
- 1996 Mašinisti / The Mashinists, Jaroslav Fragner Gallery, Prague
- 1998 Sklo a prostor / Glass and Space, Dům U Černé Matky Boží, Praha
- 1999 Mašinisti / The Mashinists, Brno House of Art
- 1999 Six sculpteurs verriers de la République tchèque, Centre tchèque de Paris
- 2000/2001 Light Transfigured - Contemporary Czech Glass Sculpture, Hida Takayama Museum of Art, Gifu, Toyama Shimin Plaza, Toyama, Hiroshima City Museum of Contemporary Art, Kanazu Forest of Creation, Fukui, Odakyu Museum, Tokyo
- 2001 Tschechische Glaskunst 1945-2000 (die Sammlung Dittrich), Galerie Prager Kabinett, Salzburg
- 2001 300 Years of Czech Decorative Art, Takasaki Museum of Art
- 2002 K poctě výtvarnému týmu - první část Sbírky Jana a Medy Mládkových / In Honour of the Art Team - the first part of the Jan and Meda Mládek Collection, Museum Kampa - Jan and Meda Mládek Foundation, Prague
- 2003/2004 Umělecká beseda, Municipal Library Prague, Prague
- 2004/2005 Captured by Light and Space, Nostický Palace, Prague
- 2005 Czech Glass Now: Contemporary Glass Sculpture 1970–2004, The Corning Museum of Glass
- 2005 EXPO 2005: Captured Light and Space, National Museum of Modern Art (MOMAT), Tokyo, Shimin Plaza City Gallery, Toyama
- 2005 Jubilarians of the Umělecká beseda, Mánes, Prague
- 2005 Pražské ateliéry / Prague Studios, New Town Hall Gallery, Prague
- 2006 Ženský prvek / Female Element, Diamant Gallery, Prague
- 20072008 Member exhibition of the Umělecká beseda, Orlická Gallery in Rychnov nad Kněžnou, Gallery of the New Town Hall, Prague, Dean's Church of the Assumption of the Virgin Mary, Most
- 2008 New Face of Prague, Czech Centre Prague, Prague
- 2009 Crossing Borders, Glasmuseet Ebeltoft
- 2009 Connections 2009, Contemporary European Glass Sculpture, Mánes, Prague
- 2009/2010 Voices of Contemporary Glass: The Heineman Collection, The Corning Museum of Glass
- 2010 SKLO.KLASIK / GLASS.CLASSIC, Queen Anne's Summer Palace (Belveder), Prague
- 2010/2011 Tsjechisch glas: Tussen traditie en vernieuwing (1958-2010), Glazen Huis - Vlaams Centrum voor Hedendaagse Glaskunst, Lommel
- 2011 Freedom to Create: Beyond the Glass Curtain, Litvak Gallery, Tel Aviv
- 2011/2012 Éclats! Le musee se met au verre... contemporain, Museum Würth, Erstein (Bas-Rhin)
- 2012/2013 All the best! Czech Glass Art, Museum of Decorative Arts, Prague
- 2015/2016 Exhibition XII. IGS, Glass Museum in Nový Bor
- 2015/2016 Glassplus à la Borges or Mirror and Masquerade, Dvorak Sec Contemporary, Prague
- 2016 Exhibition Ex-IGS, Hut' František - Centre of Glass Art, Sázava
- 2019 International biennale of glass, National Gallery - National Art Gallery (Nacionalna chudožestvena galerija), Sofia
- 2020 Once upon a time: Glass, 8smička, Humpolec
- 2023 Venice Glass Week, Crea Cantieri del Contemporaneo, Venice

== Sources ==
=== Monographs ===
- Dana Zámečníková, 116 p., texts by Joseph Campbell, Tina Oldknow, Stanislav Libenský, Suzanne K. Frantz, Prague 2000

=== Author catalogues ===
- Kristian Suda: Dana Zámečníková - Objects, Theatre in Nerudovka, Prague 1980
- Dana Zámečníková, Theater of Dreams, Heller Gallery, New York City 1989
- Dana Zámečníková: Behind the Mirror, text by Vlasta Čiháková-Noshiro, Nová síň Gallery, Prague 1994
- Dana Zámečníková, text by Jiří Machalický, Meda Mládková, Juan Eduardo Fleming, Museum Kampa - Jan and Meda Mládková Foundation, Prague 2005, ISBN 80-239-6094-6

=== Selected publications ===
- Alena Adlerová et al, Czechoslovakian Glass 1350–1980, The Corning Museum of Glass, Corning 1981
- Peter Schmitt, Glaskunst '81, 276 p., Werkstatt Verlag Kassel 1981, ISBN 3-88752-996-0
- Květa Křížová, 15 - Dobříš 1982
- Karin Webster, Contemporary Czechoslovakian Glass, Foster/White Gallery, Seattle 1982
- Joachim Kruse, Zweiter Coburger Glaspreis für moderne Glasgestaltung in Europa 1985, 432 p., Kunstsammlungen der Veste Coburg 1985
- Alena Adlerová, Mervyn Brown, Contemporary Czechoslovak Glass in Architecture, Visiting Arts Unit of Great Britain 1985
- William Trapp, Kenneth R.; Warmus, Contemporary American and European Glass from the Saxe Collection, The Oakland Museum 1986 (also catalogue cover)
- Catherine Zoritschak et al, Expressions en verre (200 sculptures de verre contemporaines, Europe, US, Japon), Musée des Arts décoratifs, Lausanne 1987
- Susanne Frantz, Thirty Years of New Glass (1957–1987), The Corning Museum of Glass 1987
- Pasqual Maragall, Pillar Muñoz, Vidre d'art (25 artist es txecoslovacs), Ajuntament de Barcelona, Barcelona 1987, ISBN 84-7609-156-7
- Alena Adlerová, Christine Wacquez-Ermel, Artistes verriers de Tchécoslovaquie (fr.), Kredietbank, Brussels 1988
- Alena Adlerová et al, Verres de Bohême (1400–1989 chefs-d'œuvre des musées de Tchécoslovaquie), Flammarion, Paris - Union des Arts Décoratifs, Paris 1989
- Alena Adlerová et al, Bohemian Glass (1400–1989), Flammarion, Paris - Union des Arts Décoratifs, Paris 1990
- Helmut Ricke, Neues Glas in Europa / New Glass in Europe. 50 Künstler - 50 Konzepte / 50 Artist - 50 Concepts, 352 p., Verlagsanstalt Handwerk GmbH, Düsseldorf 1990
- Atsushi Takeda et al, Contemporary Glass, Yokohama Museum of Art, Yokohama 1991
- One Hundred Years of Bohemian Glass, Takasaki Museum of Art 1995
- Josef Hlaváček, Jiří Šetlík, Prostor, světlo, sklo / Space, Light, Glass, VŠUP Prague 1995
- Peter Layton, Glass Art, 216 p., A & C Black, London 1996, ISBN 0-295-97565-2
- Jan Sekera, Jiří Šetlík, Sklo a prostor / Glass and Space, Czech Museum of Fine Arts, Prague 1998
- Antonín Langhamer, Legenda o českém skle, 292 p., TIGRIS spol. s r. o. 1999, ISBN 80-86062-02-3
- Expressions en verre, Musée de design et d' arts appliqués contemporains Lausanne 2000, ISBN 2-88244-004-9
- Sylva Petrová, České sklo / Czech Glass, 283 p., Gallery, LLC (Jaroslav Kořán), Prague 2001, ISBN 80-86010-44-9
- Helmut Ricke ed., Czech Glass 1945-80: Design in an Age of Adversity, published by Arnoldsche, 2005
- Jiří Machalický, in: České ateliéry / Czech studios (71 umělců současnosti / 71 contemporary artists), pp. 170–171, Art CZ, Praha 2005, ISBN 80-239-5528-4
- Pavla Rossini, Crossing Borders. Sculptural Glass and Paintings by Czech Artists, Glasmuseet Ebeltoft 2009
- Pražský festival / Prague Festival, text by Jiří Šetlík, Prague 2011
- Milan Hlaveš (ed.), XII International Glass Symposium Nový Bor, 2015, ISBN 978-80-905263-8-9 (Nový Bor), ISBN 978-80-7101-164-4 (UPM)
- Verena Wasmuth, Tschechisches Glas, Böhlau Verlag, Cologne 2016, ISBN 978-3-412-50170-9
- Sylva Petrová, Czech Glass, 419 p., Vysoká škola uměleckoprůmyslová, Praha 2018 ISBN 978-80-87989-50-0

==== Encyclopedias ====
- Who's Who Czech Republic, Federal Authorities of the Czechoslovak Republic 91/92, Volume II N-Z, 662 p., Prague 1991, ISBN 80-901103-0-4
- Who's Who in Architecture and Related Fields in the Czech Republic 1993, 271 p., Modrý jezdec, spol. s r.o., Prague 1993, ISBN 80-901631-0-6
- Who is Who in Contemporary Glass Art: A Comprehensive World Guide to Glass Artists-Craftsmen-Designers, Waldrich Verlag, Munich 1993, p. 623-625
- Anděla Horová (ed.), Nová encyklopedie českého výcyklopedného umění (N-Z) / New Encyclopedia of Czech Visual Art (N-Z), Academia, publishing house of the Academy of Sciences of the Czech Republic, Prague 1995. p. 945–946, ISBN 80-200-0522-6
- Zbyšek Malý (ed.), Dictionary of Czech and Slovak Visual Artists 1950-2010 (XXI. W - Ž), Chagall Art Centre, Ostrava 2010

=== Articles (selection) ===
- Kristian Suda, The Space of Game and Game of Space, Glassrevue 5, 1982
- Susanne K. Frantz, Seven Glass Sculptures, The Corning Museum of Glass, Corning 1994
