= Lipiński =

Lipiński (feminine Lipińska) is a Polish surname. Ukrainian version: Lypynsky, Russian: Lipinsky. Notable persons with the name include:

- Adam Lipiński (born 1956), Polish politician
- Anatoly Ivanovich Lipinsky (born 1959), Russian military leader
- Bill Lipinski (born 1937), Polish-American politician
- Blanka Lipińska, Polish writer
- Christopher A. Lipinski, originator of Lipinski's rule of five to evaluate druglikeness
- Dan Lipinski (born 1966), Polish-American politician
- Dariusz Lipiński (born 1955), Polish politician
- Edward Lipiński (economist) (1888–1986), Polish economist
- Edward Lipiński (orientalist) (1930–2024), Polish biblical scholar
- Jacek Lipiński (born 1966), Polish politician
- Karol Lipiński (1790–1861), Polish violinist and composer
- Krzysztof Lipiński (born 1984), Polish athlete
- Patrick Lipinski (born 1998), Australian athlete
- Piotr Lipiński (born 1979), Polish athlete
- Richard Lipinski (1867–1936), German politician and writer
- Tara Lipinski (born 1982), Polish-American figure-skater
- Edmund Wnuk-Lipiński (1944–2015), Polish sociologist
- Wacław Lipiński (1896–1949), Polish soldier and historian
- Vyacheslav Lypynsky (Polish: Wacław Lipiński), Ukrainian historian of Polish origin
