= Krzysztof Lipiński =

Polish luger (born 1984)

Krzysztof Lipiński (born 14 July 1984) is a Polish luger who competed from 1999 to 2006. He finished 17th in the men's doubles event at the 2006 Winter Olympics in Turin.

Lipiński's best finish at the FIL World Luge Championships was 19th in the men's doubles event at Park City, Utah in 2005.
