= Zdeněk Kopal =

Czech astronomer

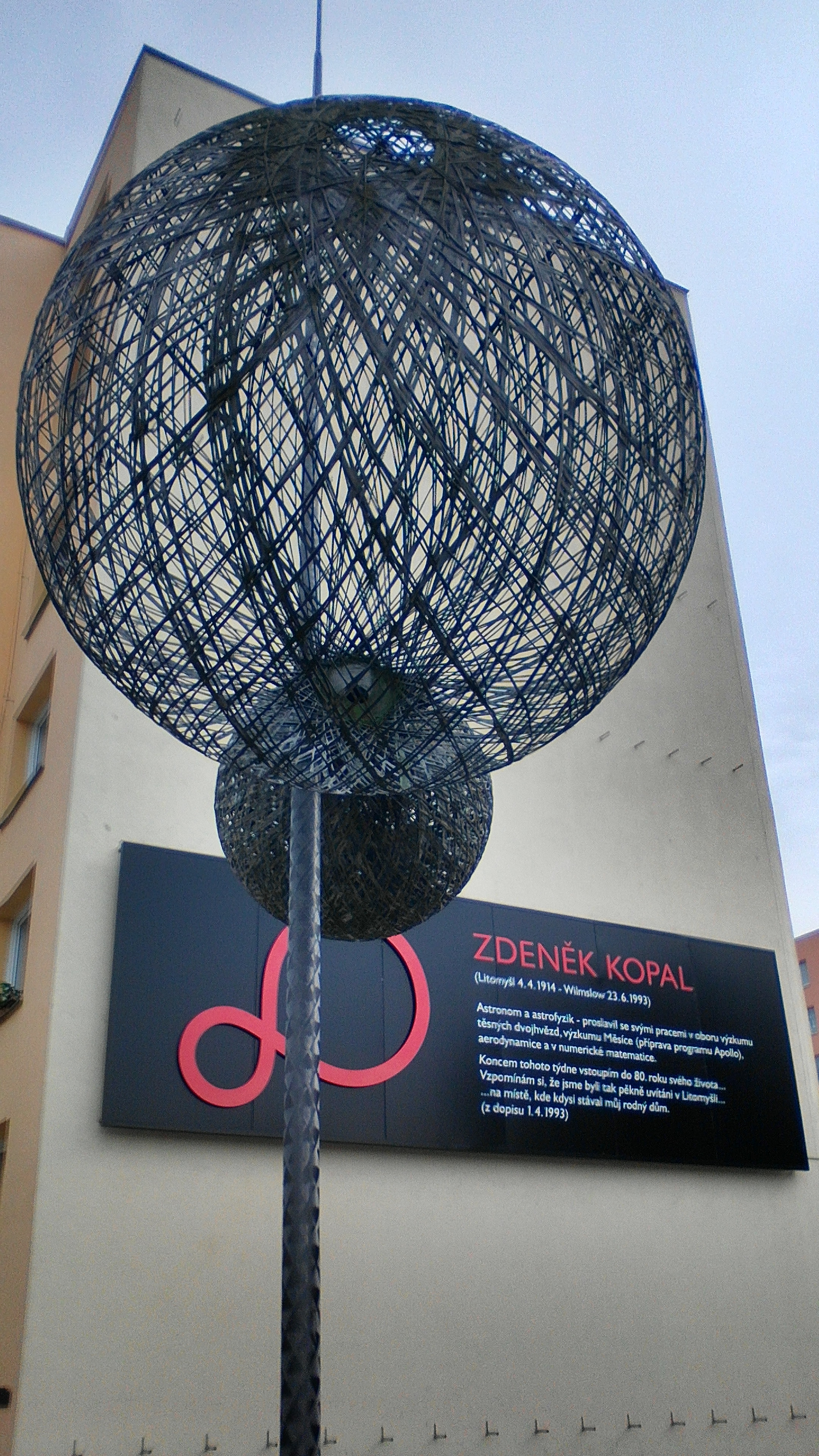
Sculpture "Binary star" at Kopal's birthplace in Litomyšl. It was made of kevlar fibers by Federico Díaz and Marian Karel.

Zdeněk Kopal (Czech pronunciation: [ˈzdɛɲɛk ˈkopal]; 4 April 1914 – 23 June 1993) was a Czechoslovak astronomer who mainly worked in England.

Kopal was born and grew up in Litomyšl (Czechoslovakia, now Czech Republic). In his early astronomical career, he studied variable stars and in particular close eclipsing binary stars. He attended Cambridge University in 1938 and later that year he went to Harvard College Observatory. After the war he became head of the astronomy department at the University of Manchester. He later assisted NASA with the Apollo program as an external expert.

He was editor-in-chief of the journal Astrophysics and Space Science since its foundation in 1968 until his death in 1993.

The asteroid 2628 Kopal was named in his honor.

== Monographs ==
- Zdeněk Kopal: An introduction to the study of eclipsing variables. Harvard University Press, Cambridge (MA) 1946.
- Zdeněk Kopal: Close binary systems. Chapman & Hall, London 1959.
- Zdeněk Kopal: The moon. Our nearest celestial neighbour. Chapman & Hall, London 1960.
- Zdeněk Kopal, Josef Klepešta, Thomas W. Rackham: Photographic atlas of the moon. Academic Press, New York 1965.
- Zdeněk Kopal: Telescopes in space. Hart Publishers Co., New York 1970.
- Zdeněk Kopal: A new photographic atlas of the moon. Hale, London 1971.
- Zdeněk Kopal: Physics and astronomy of the moon. Academic Press, New York 1971.
- Zdeněk Kopal: Man and his universe. William Morrow, New York 1972.
- Zdeněk Kopal: Zpráva o vesmíru. Mladá fronta, Praha 1976.
- Zdeněk Kopal: Dynamics of close binary systems. Reidel, Dordrecht 1978.
- Zdeněk Kopal: Language of stars – a discourse on the theory of the light changes eclipsing variables. Reidel, Dordrecht 1979.
- Zdeněk Kopal: The realm of the terrestrial planets. John Wiley, New York 1979.
- Zdeněk Kopal: Of stars and men: Reminiscences of an astronomer. Adam Hilger, Bristol 1986. 2012 pbk reprint
- Zdeněk Kopal: Vesmírní sousedé naší planety. Academia, Praha 1987.
- Zdeněk Kopal: The Roche problem. The Roche problem and its significance for double-star astronomy. Kluwer, Dordrecht 1989.
- Zdeněk Kopal: Mathematical theory of stellar eclipses. Kluwer, Dordrecht 1990.
- Zdeněk Kopal: O hvězdách a lidech. Mladá fronta, Praha 1991.
