= Faculty of Architecture, Czech Technical University in Prague =

Czech Technical University in Prague Faculty of Architecture
- Fakulta architektury ČVUT
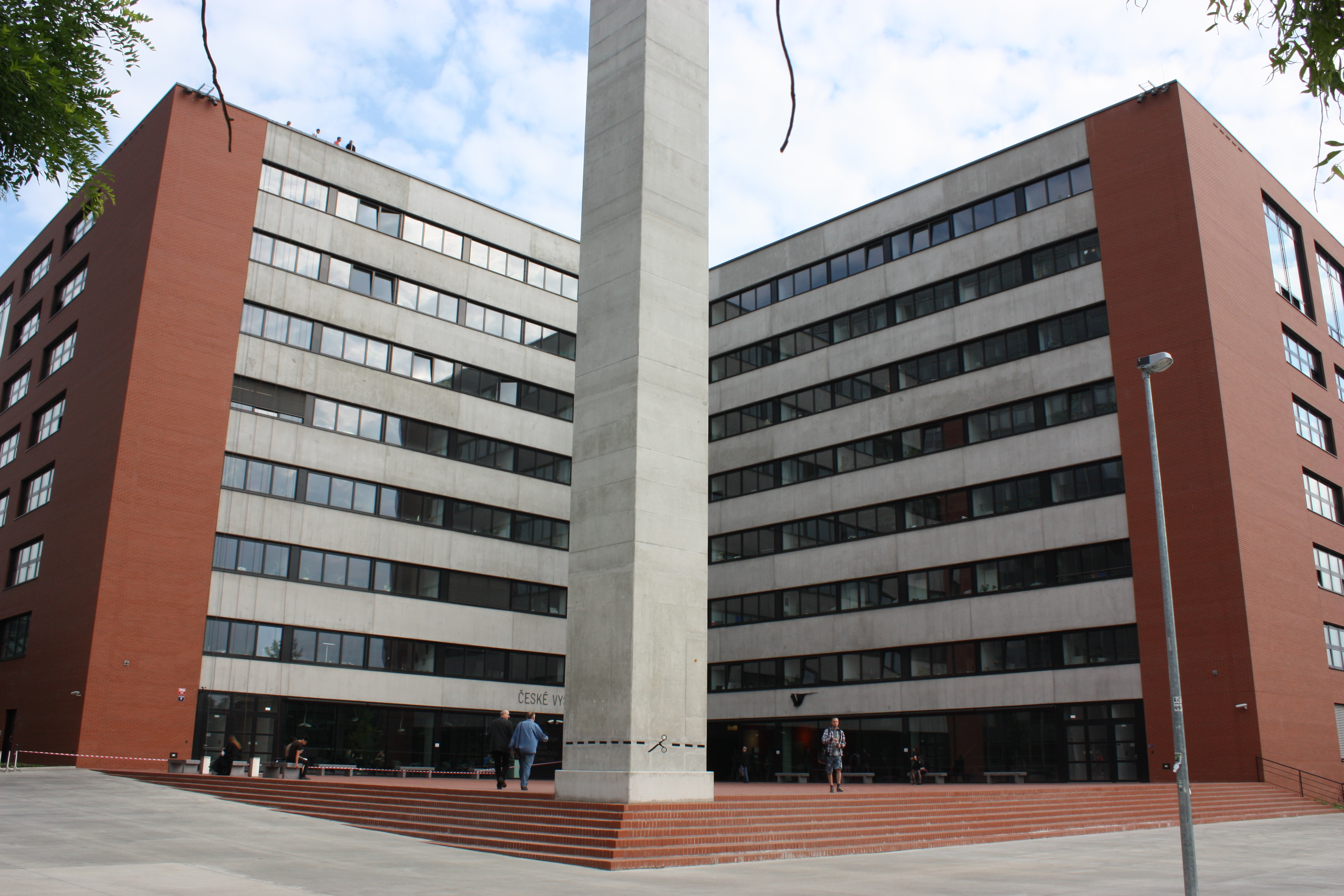
- Type: Public
- Established: 1806 (as Prague Polytechnical Institute); 1976 (newly established Faculty of Architecture)
- Dean: doc. Ing. arch. Dalibor Hlaváček, Ph.D.
- Academic staff: 197 (2023)
- Students: 1920 (2023)
- Undergraduates: 1083
- Postgraduates: 701
- Doctoral students: 136
- Location: Prague, Czech Republic
- Campus: Urban
- Website: fa.cvut.cz/en

The Faculty of Architecture (Czech: Fakulta architektury, abbr: FA) is one of the faculties of the Czech Technical University in Prague. It is the largest architecture school and the biggest research-and-development institution in the fields of architecture and urban design in the Czech Republic. The school offers undergraduate and graduate programmes including doctoral programme.

The faculty building located in the campus in Prague-Dejvice was built in 2011 and designed by Czech architect Alena Šrámková. The third floor of the building is shared with Faculty of Information Technology.

The faculty is member of international institutions such as, European Association for Architectural Education (EAAE), Association of European Schools of Planning (AESOP) and Arbeitskreis für Hausforschung e.V.

== Study programmes ==
The faculty provides 3 main study programmes for the students:

- Architecture and Urbanism
- Landscape Architecture
- Design

== Studies ==
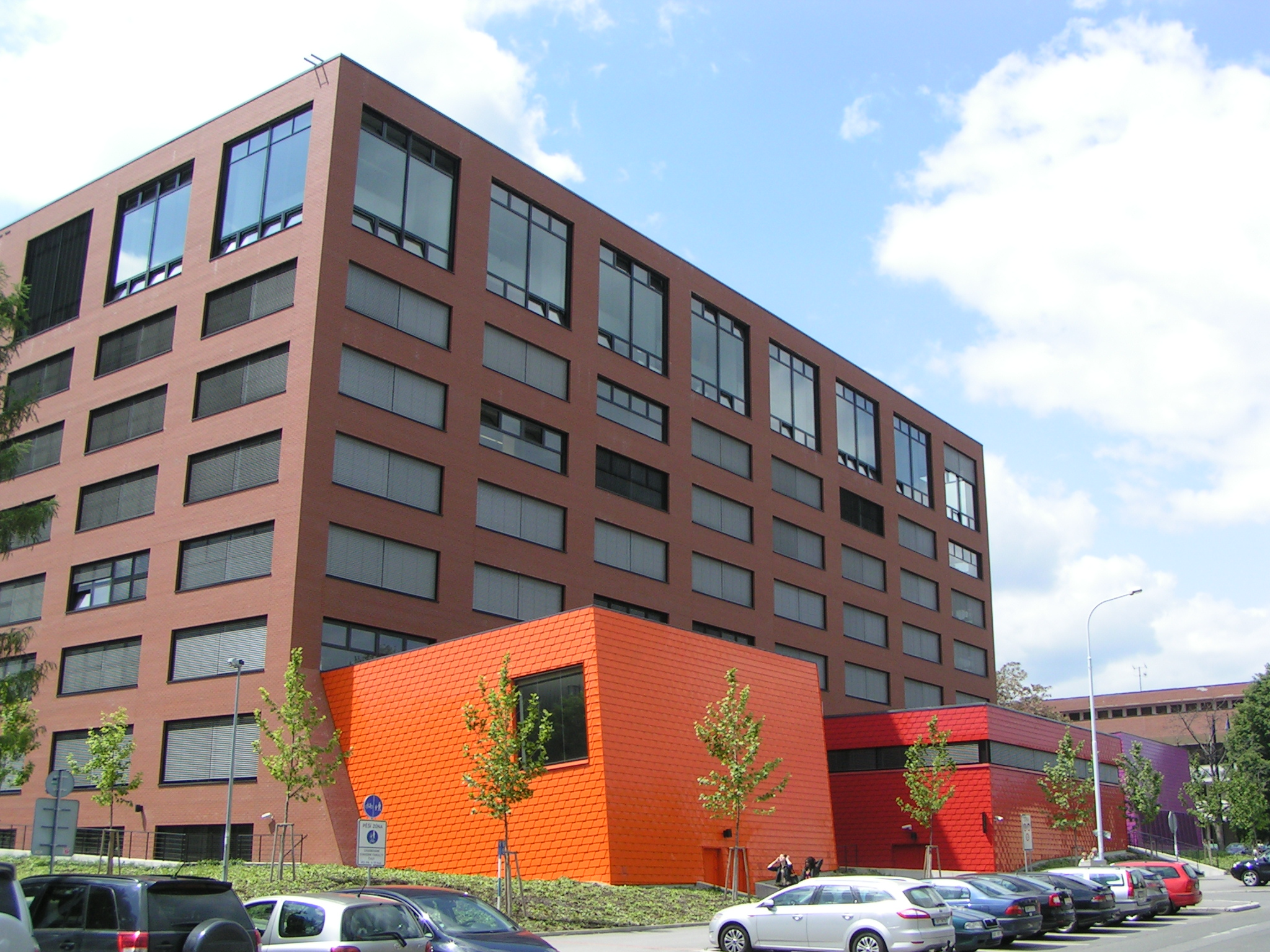
Colorful lecture halls on the backside of the Faculty building, viewed from Thákurova street

At the Faculty of Architecture, a large part of the study is traditionally conducted in the form of teaching on specific projects developed in design studios. The possibility of choosing a design studio project leader for each semester ensures direct feedback between students and teachers. Teaching takes place in so-called "vertical" studios in which students from the second to the fifth year work side by side on different types of projects. The projects are led by leading architects, urban planners and designers from Czechia and abroad. For example, in 2023, one of the design studios was hosted by Dutch architect Winy Maas from the MVRDV architecture practice.

In the academic year 2023/24 there were 1083 students studying in the Bachelor cycle. In the follow-up Master's cycle 701 students. There were 136 students in the doctoral programme. That means 1920 students in total.

23 professors, 48 associate professors and 126 assistant professors teach at the faculty. That is 197 teachers in total.
