= Advanced Drug Delivery Reviews =

- Discipline: Pharmacology
- Language: English
- Edited by: H. Ghandehari

Publication details
- History: 1987-present
- Publisher: Elsevier
- Frequency: 15/year
- Impact factor: 15.47 (2020)

Standard abbreviations
- ISO 4: Adv. Drug Deliv. Rev.

Indexing
- CODEN: ADDREP
- ISSN: 0169-409X (print); 1872-8294 (web)
- LCCN: sn87026401
- OCLC no.: 13190647

Links
- Journal homepage; Online access

Advanced Drug Delivery Reviews is a peer-reviewed medical journal covering research involving the controlled release and delivery of drugs and other biologically active agents.

The editor-in-chief is H. Ghandehari.

== Abstracting and indexing ==
The journal is abstracted and indexed in BIOSIS Previews, CAB Abstracts, Chemical Abstracts, Current Contents/Life Sciences, EMBASE, MEDLINE, Science Citation Index Expanded, and Scopus.
