= Chemical property =

Material properties that become evident due to a chemical reaction

A chemical property is any of a material's properties that becomes evident during, or after, a chemical reaction; that is, any attribute that can be established only by changing a substance's chemical identity. Simply speaking, chemical properties cannot be determined just by viewing or touching the substance; the substance's internal structure must be affected greatly for its chemical properties to be investigated. When a substance goes under a chemical reaction, the properties will change drastically, resulting in chemical change. However, a catalytic property would also be a chemical property.

Chemical properties can be contrasted with physical properties, which can be discerned without changing the substance's structure. However, for many properties within the scope of physical chemistry, and other disciplines at the boundary between chemistry and physics, the distinction may be a matter of researcher's perspective. Material properties, both physical and chemical, can be viewed as supervenient; i.e., secondary to the underlying reality. Several layers of superveniency are possible.

Chemical properties can be used for building chemical classifications. They can also be useful to identify an unknown substance or to separate or purify it from other substances. Materials science will normally consider the chemical properties of a substance to guide its app.

== Examples ==
- Heat of combustion
- Enthalpy of formation
- Toxicity
- Chemical stability in a given environment
- Flammability (the ability to burn)
- Preferred oxidation state(s)
- Ability to corrode
- Combustibility
- Acidity and basicity

== See also ==
- Chemical structure
- Material properties
- Biological activity
- Quantitative structure–activity relationship (QSAR)
- Lipinski's Rule of Five, describing molecular properties of drugs
