= Physical property =

Attribute of a physical system or body or non-chemical property of a material

A physical property is any property of a physical system that is measurable. The changes in the physical properties of a system can be used to describe its changes between momentary states. A quantifiable physical property is called physical quantity. Measurable physical quantities are often referred to as observables. Some physical properties are qualitative, such as shininess, brittleness, color, etc.; some general qualitative properties admit more specific related quantitative properties, such as in opacity, hardness, ductility, viscosity, etc.

Physical properties are often characterized as intensive and extensive properties. An intensive property does not depend on the size or extent of the system, nor on the amount of matter in the object, while an extensive property shows an additive relationship. These classifications are in general only valid in cases when smaller subdivisions of the sample do not interact in some physical or chemical process when combined.

Properties may also be classified with respect to the directionality of their nature. For example, isotropic properties do not change with the direction of observation, and anisotropic properties do have directional variance.

It may be difficult to determine whether a given property is a material property or not. Color, for example, can be seen and measured; however, what one perceives as color is really an interpretation of the reflective properties of a surface and the light used to illuminate it. In this sense, many ostensibly physical properties are called supervenient. A supervenient property is one which is actual, but is secondary to some underlying reality. This is similar to the way in which objects are supervenient on atomic structure. A cup might have the physical properties of mass, shape, color, temperature, etc., but these properties are supervenient on the underlying atomic structure, which may in turn be supervenient on an underlying quantum structure.

Physical properties are contrasted with chemical properties which determine the way a material behaves in a chemical reaction. The term physicochemical property is often used to describe physical properties that are especially relevant to the field of chemistry.

== List of properties ==
The physical properties of an object that are traditionally defined by classical mechanics are often called mechanical properties. Other broad categories, commonly cited, are electrical properties, optical properties, thermal properties, etc. Physical properties include:

- absorption (physical)
- absorption (electromagnetic)
- albedo
- angular momentum
- area
- boiling point
- brittleness
- capacitance
- color
- concentration
- density
- dielectric
- ductility
- distribution
- efficacy
- elasticity
- electric charge
- electrical conductivity
- electrical impedance
- electric field
- electric potential
- emission
- flow rate (mass)
- flow rate (volume)
- fluidity
- frequency
- hardness
- heat capacity
- inductance
- intrinsic impedance
- intensity
- irradiance
- length
- location
- luminance
- luminescence
- luster
- malleability
- magnetic field
- magnetic flux
- mass
- melting point
- moment
- momentum
- opacity
- permeability
- permittivity
- plasticity
- pressure
- radiance
- resistivity
- reflectivity
- refractive index
- solubility
- specific heat
- spin
- strength
- stiffness
- temperature
- tension
- thermal conductivity (and resistance)
- velocity
- viscosity
- volume
- wave impedance

== See also ==
- List of materials properties
- Physical quantity
- Physical test
- Test method

== Bibliography ==
- Cesare Emiliani (1987). Dictionary of the Physical Sciences: Terms, Formulas, Data. Oxford University Press. ISBN 978-0-19-503651-0.
- Robert A. Meyers (2001). Encyclopedia of Physical Science and Technology (3rd ed.). Academic Press.
