= Softgel =

Gelatin-based oral dosage form

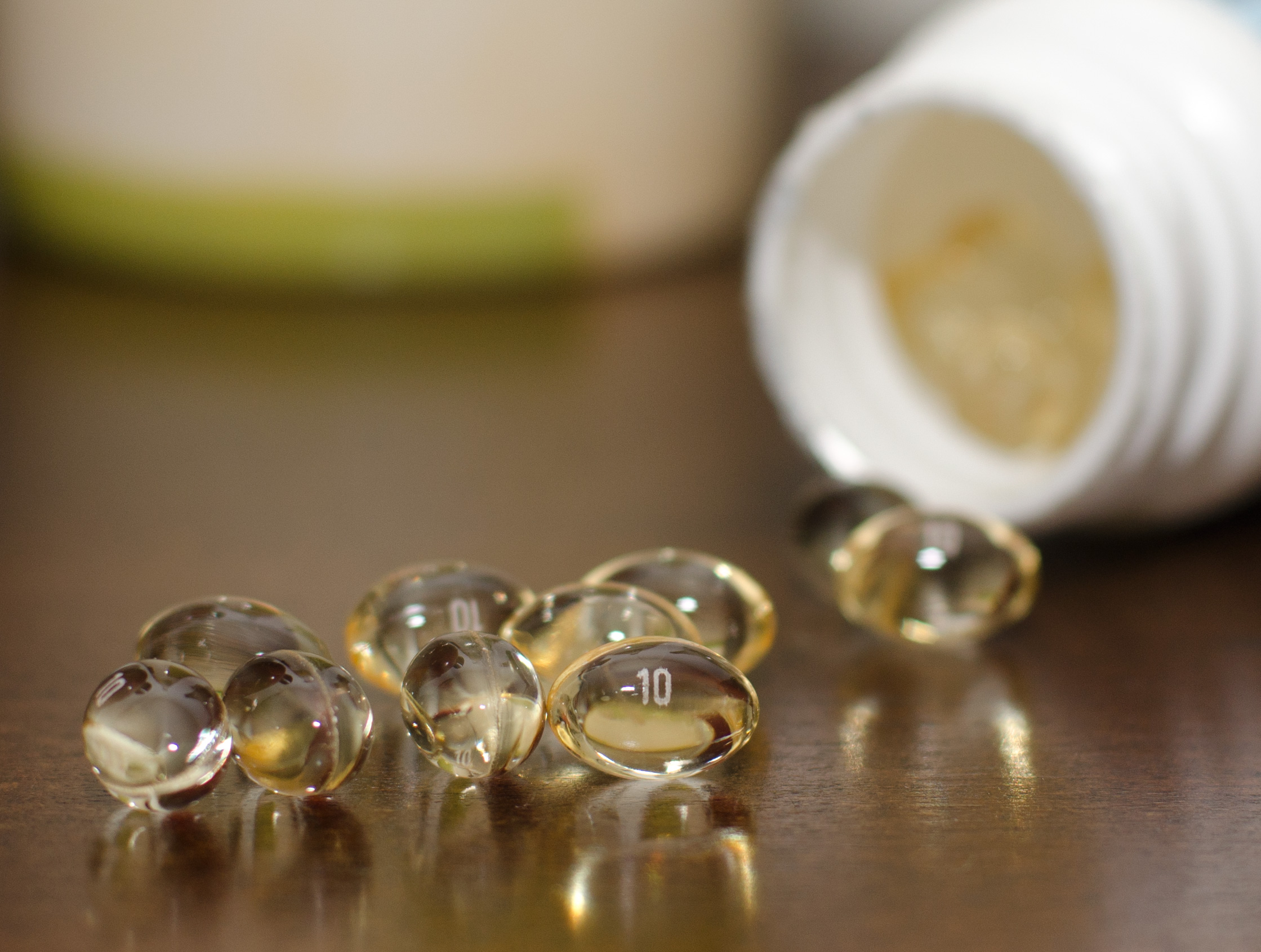
Typical softgels

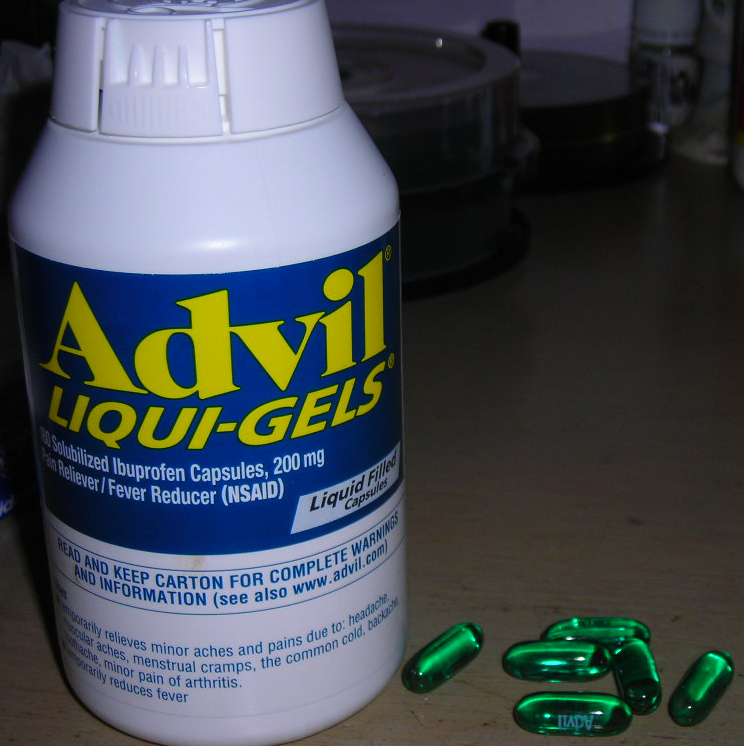
Advil liqui-gels

A softgel or a soft capsule is an oral dosage form for medicine in the form of a specialized capsule. They consist of a shell surrounding a liquid fill. The shell is originally made of gelatin, but vegetarian types also exist.

== Types ==
=== Gelatin type ===
Softgel shells are a combination of gelatin, water, opacifier and a plasticiser such as glycerin or sorbitol.

Softgels are produced in a process known as encapsulation using the Rotary Die Encapsulation process invented by Robert Pauli Scherer. The encapsulation process has been described as a form/fill/seal process. Two flat ribbons of shell material are manufactured on the machine and brought together on a twin set of rotating dies. The dies contain recesses in the desired size and shape, which cut out the ribbons into a two-dimensional shape, and form a seal around the outside. At the same time a pump delivers a precise dose of fill material through a nozzle incorporated into a filling wedge whose tip sits between the two ribbons in between two die pockets at the point of cut out. The wedge is heated to facilitate the sealing process. The wedge injection causes the two flat ribbons to expand into the die pockets, giving rise to the three-dimensional finished product. After encapsulation, the softgels are dried for two days to two weeks depending on the product.

Catalent Pharma Solutions is the current owner of the RPScherer technology.

=== Vegetarian types ===
Since the 1990s, manufacturers have been able to replace gelatin in the shell with vegetarian polymers including modified starch, carrageenan-modified starch, and alginate. The first commercially-viable type was made of carrageenan-modified starch (CMS) and entered market in 2001. The first carrageenan-free vegetarian softgel was Plantgels made from modified tapioca starch.

Carrageenan is produced from red seaweeds. Seaweed harvests can be affected by climate change.

== See also ==
- Capsule
