= Zydis =

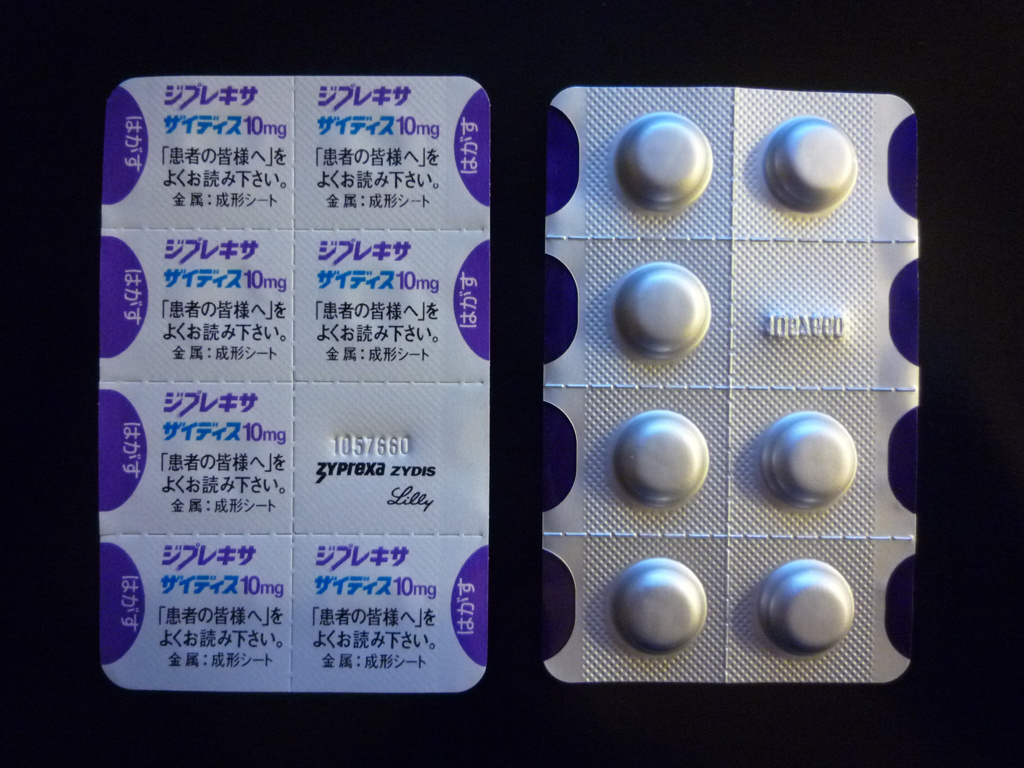
Zyprexa-Zydis tablets from Eli Lilly and Company, Japan

Zydis is a technology used to manufacture orally disintegrating tablets developed by R.P. Scherer Corporation. Zydis tablets dissolve in the mouth within 3 seconds.

== History ==
Zydis technology was developed by R.P. Scherer Corporation (currently owned by Catalent Pharma Solutions) in 1986. The technology's first commercial application was in August, 1993, when a new dosage form of Pepcidine (famotidine) from Merck & Co. was launched in Sweden.

In November 1993 Imodium Lingual (loperamide) from Janssen Pharmaceutica was released in Germany with Zydis technology.

In December, 1996, the Food and Drug Administration approved Claritin (loratadine) RediTabs from Schering-Plough, the first prescription drug with Zydis technology sold in the U.S.

== Technology ==
A Zydis tablet is produced by lyophilizing or freeze-drying the drug in a matrix usually consisting of gelatin. The resulting product is very lightweight and fragile, and must be dispensed in a special blister pack.

Amipara et al., in their article "Oral disintirating tablet of antihypertensive drug" explain the technology's limitations:

The Zydis formulations consist of a drug physically trapped in a water-soluble matrix (saccharine mixture and polymer), which is freeze dried to produce a product that dissolves rapidly when placed in mouth. The ideal candidate for Zydis technology should be chemically stable and insoluble and particle size preferably less than 50 micron.

Water soluble drugs might form eutectic mixtures and not freeze adequately, so dose is limited to 60 mg and the maximum drug limit is 400 mg for water insoluble drug as large particle sizes might present sedimentation problems during manufacture.

== Advantages and disadvantages ==
=== Advantages ===
Zydis tablets:

- are convenient for the patients who have difficulty in swallowing (children, old people, bed-ridden and psychiatric patients);
- are fast to absorb;
- don't require water to consume;
- have good taste (mouth feel);
- don't provoke choking or suffocation;
- have high microbial resistance ("due to the low moisture content in the final product, the Zydis formulation does not allow microbial growth").

=== Disadvantages ===
Disadvantages include:

- increased price due to cost-intensive production;
- sensitivity to moisture (tablets can degrade at higher humidity);
- poor physical resistance (easy to break);
- limited ability to incorporate higher concentrations of active drug.

== Fast dissolving drugs with Zydis technology ==
Trade name	Active formula	Manufacturer	Indication
Ativan	Lorazepam	Valeant Pharmaceuticals	Anxiety disorders
Claritin RediTab	Loratadine	Schering-Plough	Allergy
Imodium	Loperamide	Johnson & Johnson	Diarrhea
Feldene melt	Piroxicam	Pfizer	Pain relief
Maxalt MLT	Rizatriptan	Merck & Co.	Headache
Motilium	Domperidone	Johnson & Johnson	Nausea and vomiting
Zelapar	Selegiline	Valeant Pharmaceuticals	Parkinson's disease, depression
Pepcid RPD	Famotidine	Johnson & Johnson	Peptic ulcer disease (PUD), gastroesophageal reflux disease (GERD/GORD)
Zyprexa	Olanzapine	Eli Lilly and Company	Schizophrenia, bipolar disorder
Zofran ODT	Ondansetron	GlaxoSmithKline	Nausea and vomiting
Nurtec ODT	Rimegepant	Pfizer	Migraine

Data from "Fast Disintegrating Drug Delivery Systems: A Review with Special Emphasis on Fast Disintegrating Tablets" (2013).

== See also ==
- Orally disintegrating tablet
- Catalent Pharma Solutions
