= Avicine =

Avicine, tested and developed by AVI BioPharma, and also known as CTP-37 was trialled as a possible cancer vaccine to treat a number of different cancers. These included colorectal cancer, pancreatic cancer and prostate cancer. The treatment was trialled as and intended to be induced via intramuscular injection into the bloodstream, the location dependent on the treatment area.

Common side effects during clinical trials included fever and chills as experienced with many other conventional vaccines. The vaccine operated by eliciting antibodies against human chorionic gonadotropin (hCG) a cancer associated protein expressed by most cancer cells, with the goal of prolonged survival for those affected.

Avicine was originated by AVI BioPharma in the USA, who licensed the product to SuperGen. However, due to delays in clinical testing, as a result of research difficulties, the owners of Avicine were forced to direct their attention to other areas being the investigation and treatment of cardiovascular and infectious disease indications.

== Medical Uses ==
Avicine never reached the commercial treatment phase as research was discontinued on 15 January 2007. The cancers Avicine was designed to manage were, pancreatic, colorectal and prostate cancer. In a one-year, Phase II Avicine cancer vaccine study, a group of patients were treated with Avicine alongside the combination of Gemcitabine (Gemzar), the results yielding that Avicine could be induced alongside Gemzar, in the prostate region. As the 3rd and 4th clinical trials were not done this was never done as a commercial treatment.

== Contraindications and drug interactions ==
Patients who were pregnant were not to be treated by Avicine, as it elicits antibodies against hCG, a cancer associated oncofoetal protein that is also prevalent during the development of a child in the womb.

As of 2007, due to the discontinued state of Avicine research, drug interactions have not been studied.

== Adverse Effects ==
Results from a multi-center phase II study in test subjects with metastatic colorectal cancer in USA exposed that of 64 patients some experienced fevers and chills. Overall, the vaccines were tolerated well by the patients. 69% (55 of the 73 patients).

== Key Development Milestones ==
=== Colorectal Cancer ===
After successfully completing a Phases I and II trials for the use of Avicine in colorectal cancer, a phase III licensing trail began to investigate Avicine as a first line treatment for colorectal patients alongside chemotherapy in January 2001. The trial was randomised where the patients would either receive Avicine in combination with chemotherapy or chemotherapy unaided. However, Phase III was discontinued as of 15 January 2007.

=== Pancreatic Cancer ===
A multi-centre Phase II clinical trial of Avicine was conducted by Avi Biopharma, including 55 patients in the US. The trial was conducted 10 patients with pancreatic cancer saw positive results in a pilot phase II trial of Avicine.

A plan was proposed to begin a phase III trial for patients with pancreatic cancer. However, in 2003 it was reported in order to do so an additional corporate partner was needed for the trial to be instigated. Research was discontinued on 15 January 2007 as an additional corporate partner was found and phase II was still not complete.

=== Prostate Cancer ===
A phase I trial of Avicine was completed by Avi Biopharma in patients with prostate cancer, however after this stage research was discontinued on 15 January 2007.

== Drug Properties and Chemical Synopsis ==
Route of administration: IM

Formulation: unspecified

Class: Cancer Vaccines

Mechanism of Action: Immunomodulator; Immunostimulant

WHO ATC code: L03A-X (Other immunostimulants)

EPhMRA code: L3A (Immunostimulating Agents Excluding Intereferons)

== Chemistry of Avicine ==
The chemical and physical properties of Avicine can be highlighted in the table below:

Property Name	Property Value
Molecular Weight	332.3 g/mol
XLogP3-AA	4.4
Hydrogen Bond Donor Count	0
Hydrogen Bond Acceptor Count	4
Rotatable Bond Count	0
Monoisotopic Mass	332.092283 g/mol
Exact Mass	332.092283 g/mol
Heavy Atom Count	25
Topological Polar Surface Area Count	40.8 Å2
Formal Charge	1
Complexity	530
Covalently Bonded Unit Count	1
Compound is Canocalized	Yes
Isotope Atom Count	0
Defined Atom Stereocenter Count	0

== Pharmacology ==
Avicine (CTP-37) is a peptide fragment of Human chorionic gonadotropin (hCG), an oncofoetal protein expressed by most cancer lines, the significant role of hCG being to ward off the immune system, the same way cells of the developing foetus ward off the immune system. In some studies expressions of hCG in colorectal cancer has been positively correlated with reduced survival rates. Two epitopes can be found in CTP-37 one of which is dominant and can elicit anti-bodies against hCG.

By employing this ideology Avi Biopharma created a modulated form of CTP-37 (Avicine) containing an extra peptide domain, more specifically denoted as a loop peptide. The modulation of the earlier formulation was done to force the immune system to act against multiple epitopes, with the aim of improving the survival rate of individuals with cancer. The moderated formula of Avicine was built on the basis of a study that indicated patients exhibited prolonged survival when they responded to more than one vaccine epitope.

The majority of the world's population have been vaccinated against diphtheria use diphtheria toxoid (DT), and was therefore used a carrier protein due to the significant data available on its effects as a vaccine. Also, the established immune response to DT was also believed to be important in encouraging an immune response to hCG peptides.

== Therapeutic Trials ==
=== Colorectal Cancer ===
Phase I tests demonstrated a satisfactory safety profile of Avicine (CTP37-diphtheria toxoid/DT), whilst also establishing the immunological activity of the drug. In the following Phase II study 77 patients with colorectal cancer were treated with Avicine using Active Specialised Immunization (ASI), the CTP37-DT, prompting antibodies in patients experiencing cancers that expressed very high hCG levels. The patients were given the vaccine at week 0, 4, 10 and 16. Of the 77 patients 56 of those produced antibodies to human chorionic gonadotrophin (hCG), in response to the vaccine. By intention-to-treat analysis it was observed that of the vaccinated patients the median survival was 34 weeks. The median survival of patients who those who did not produce antibodies from the vaccine was 17 weeks, whilst the patients who developed antibodies from the vaccine exhibited a median survival of 42 weeks. Also, patients who developed median antibody levels (n=39) expressed higher survival rates than those who expressed antibody levels below the median value (n=38), where survival rates were 45 weeks and 24 weeks respectively (AVI BioPharma Inc.). Additionally, CTP-37 consists of two epitopes and those who responded to both epitopes demonstrated prolonged survival, with 65 weeks, compared to those who only reacted against one epitope who experienced a 39-week survival rate. Another randomised group was also given Pharmacia-Upjohn's Camptosar, where the subjects experienced a mean 35 weeks survival rate. Using this data AVI Biopharma formulated a new version of CTP-37 vaccine, which included another hCG peptide referred to as the loop peptide. Inclusion of the loop peptide is used primarily to modulate the dominance of the original substance, which would ideally force the immune system to react to the multiple epitopes, culminating with prolonged survival rates for colorectal cancer patients.

=== Pancreatic Cancer ===
55 pancreatic cancer patients were included in a study which confirmed treatment with Avicine produces comparable survival rates to treatment with Gemcitabine. A group was also tested with gemcitabine combined with Avicine, and expressed significantly better survival rates than those who were treated with either substance independently. Also, Gemcitabine did not affect the patients ability to have an immune response to Avicine's epitopes.

Data from a phase Ib study including ten patients with pancreatic cancer established the safety and value of the use of Avicine in the subjects. The patients survived for periods greater than 6 months, which were historical survival rates for patients with metastatic pancreatic cancer. During the phase II study, one patient survived greater than 20 months, three lived more than 11 months, and 4 out of 6 patients remaining exceeded the 5.3 month period of median historical survival for this disease in 2001. The median survival in the 10 pancreatic patients was equal to 33 weeks with the Avicine (CTP-37) vaccine.
