= Deudomperidone =

Chemical compound

Clinical data
- Other names: CIN-102; deuterated domperidone; domperidone deuterated

Identifiers
- IUPAC name: 3-[3-[4-(5-chloro-2-oxo-3H-benzimidazol-1-yl)piperidin-1-yl]propyl]-4,5,6,7-tetradeuterio-1H-benzimidazol-2-one
- CAS Number: 2121525-08-2
- PubChem CID: 153420471
- ChemSpider: 58794254
- UNII: HN0VIB0W8W
- KEGG: D11864
- ChEMBL: ChEMBL4594380

Chemical and physical data
- Formula: C_{22}H_{20}ClD_{4}N_{5}O_{2}
- Molar mass: 429.94 g·mol^{−1}
- 3D model (JSmol): Interactive image
- SMILES: [2H]C1=C(C(=C2C(=C1[2H])NC(=O)N2CCCN3CCC(CC3)N4C5=C(C=C(C=C5)Cl)NC4=O)[2H])[2H]
- InChI: InChI=1S/C22H24ClN5O2/c23-15-6-7-20-18(14-15)25-22(30)28(20)16-8-12-26(13-9-16)10-3-11-27-19-5-2-1-4-17(19)24-21(27)29/h1-2,4-7,14,16H,3,8-13H2,(H,24,29)(H,25,30)/i1D,2D,4D,5D; Key:FGXWKSZFVQUSTL-GYABSUSNSA-N

Deudomperidone (developmental code name CIN-102; also known as deuterated domperidone) is a dopamine antagonist medication which is under development in the United States for the treatment of gastroparesis. It acts as a selective dopamine D_{2} and D_{3} receptor antagonist and has peripheral selectivity. Deudomperidone is a deuterated form of domperidone, and it is suggested that deudomperidone may have improved efficacy, tolerability, and pharmacokinetics compared to domperidone. As of January 2022, deudomperidone is in phase 2 clinical trials for the treatment of gastroparesis.

== See also ==
- Metopimazine
- Trazpiroben
