= Orally disintegrating tablet =

Pill that dissolves on contact with saliva

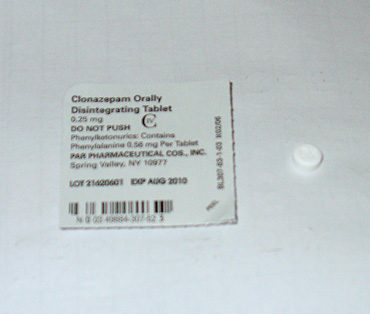
Clonazepam ODT blister pack and tablet

An orally disintegrating tablet or orally dissolving tablet (ODT) is a drug dosage form available for a limited range of over-the-counter (OTC) and prescription medications. ODTs differ from traditional tablets in that they are designed to be dissolved on the tongue rather than swallowed whole. The ODT serves as an alternative dosage form for patients who experience dysphagia (difficulty in swallowing) or for where compliance is a known issue and therefore an easier dosage form to take ensures that medication is taken. Common among all age groups, dysphagia is observed in about 35% of the general population, as well as up to 60% of the elderly institutionalized population and 18-22% of all patients in long-term care facilities ODTs may have a faster onset of effect than tablets or capsules, and have the convenience of a tablet that can be taken without water. During the last decade, ODTs have become available in a variety of therapeutic markets, both OTC and by prescription.

== History ==
Tablets designed to dissolve on the buccal (cheek) mucous membrane were a precursor to the ODT. This dosage form was intended for drugs that yield low bioavailability through the digestive tract but are inconvenient to administer parenterally, such as steroids and narcotic analgesics. Absorption through the cheek allows the drug to bypass the digestive tract for rapid systemic distribution. Not all ODTs have buccal absorption and many have similar absorption and bioavailability to standard oral dosage forms with the primary route remaining GI absorption. However, a fast disintegration time and a small tablet weight can enhance absorption in the buccal area. The first ODTs disintegrated through effervescence rather than dissolution, and were designed to make taking vitamins more pleasant for children. This method was adapted to pharmaceutical use with the invention of microparticles containing a drug, which would be released upon effervescence of the tablet and swallowed by the patient. Dissolution became more effective than effervescence through improved manufacturing processes and ingredients (such as the addition of mannitol to increase binding and decrease dissolution time). Catalent Pharma Solutions (formerly Scherer DDS) in the U.K., Cima Labs and Fuisz Technologies (whose founder Richard Fuisz went on to pioneer orally soluble films, a separate but related dosage form) in the U.S. and Takeda Pharmaceutical Company in Japan led the development of ODTs.

The first ODT form of a drug to get approval from the U.S. Food and Drug Administration (FDA) was a Zydis ODT formation of Claritin (loratadine) in December 1996. It was followed by a Zydis ODT formulation of Klonopin (clonazepam) in December 1997, and a Zydis ODT formulation of Maxalt (rizatriptan) in June 1998. The regulatory condition for meeting the definition of an orally disintegrating tablet is USP method 701 for Disintegration. FDA guidance issued in Dec 2008 is that ODT drugs should disintegrate in less than 30 seconds. This practice is under review by the FDA as the fast disintegration time of ODTs makes the disintegration test too rigorous for some of the ODT formulations that are commercially available.

== Manufacturing/packaging ==
The processes used to manufacture orally disintegrating tablets include loose compression tabletting, a process which is not very different than the manufacturing method used for traditional tablets and lyophilization processes. In loose compression, ODTs are compressed at much lower forces (4 – 20 kN) than traditional tablets. However, since ODTs are compressed at very low forces due to the need for them to be soft enough to disintegrate rapidly in the mouth, issues of material sticking to the die walls can be challenging. Typically, as in most tablet blends, lubricants such as magnesium stearate are added to the blend to reduce the amount of material that may stick to the die wall. Differences may be the use of disintegrating aids, such as crospovidone, and binding agents that aid in mouth feel, such as microcrystalline cellulose. Primarily, ODTs contain some form of sugar such as mannitol, which typically serves as the major diluent of the ODTs, and is also the primary contributor to the smooth and creamy mouth feel of most ODTs. Lyophilized ODT formulations may use proprietary technologies but can produce a tablet that has a faster disintegration rate, for example the Zydis ODT typically dissolves in the mouth in less than 5 seconds without water and Lyophilized Freeze drying tablets - ODT typically dissolves in the mouth in few seconds depending on the molecules and strength.

ODTs are available in HPDE bottles (Parcopa) or individually sealed in blister packs to protect the tablets from damage, moisture, and oxidation. Because ODTs are soft in nature, the ability to successfully package an ODT in a bottle is difficult. However, CIMA Labs markets their Durasolv ODT as being able to be placed into bottle for commercial sale, while CIMA's Orasolv is marketed for blisters only. Zydis ODT tablets manufactured by Catalent Pharma Solutions and Lyophilized Freeze drying tablets manufactured by Galien-LPS are delivered in a blister pack. The differences between the two CIMA products are proprietary, however, the primary difference is expected to be the use of microcrystalline cellulose (MCC), such as Avicel PH101, in the Durasolv product. MCC serves multiple purposes in an ODT but in the case of CIMA's products, it acts as a binder, increasing the internal strength of the tablet and making it more robust for packaging in bottles.

== ODTs currently or previously available ==
Brand name	Manufactured by/for	Generic available	Active ingredient	Category	Indication	Intended age
Abilify Discmelt	Otsuka America/Bristol-Myers Squibb	yes	aripiprazole	Atypical antipsychotics	Schizophrenia	13 years+
Abilify Discmelt	Otsuka America/Bristol-Myers Squibb	yes	aripiprazole	Atypical antipsychotics	Bipolar disorder	10 years+
Abilify Discmelt	Otsuka America/Bristol-Myers Squibb	yes	aripiprazole	Atypical antipsychotics	Adjunct therapy for major depressive disorder	adults
Adzenys XR-ODT	Neos Therapeutics	no	amphetamine	Amphetamines, Stimulants	Attention deficit hyperactivity disorder	6 years+
Alavert Quick Dissolving Tablets	Wyeth	yes	loratadine	Antihistamines	Allergy	6 years+
Allegra ODT	Sanofi Aventis	yes	fexofenadine	Antihistamines	Allergic rhinitis, Urticaria	6–11 years
Aricept ODT	Eisai Co.	yes	donepezil	Acetylcholinesterase inhibitors	Alzheimer's disease	adults
Benadryl FastMelt	Pfizer	yes	diphenhydramine	Antihistamines	Allergy	6 years+
Calpol Fast Melts	McNeil Healthcare UK	yes	paracetamol	Analgesics	Pain	6 years+
Cipralex MELTZ	Lundbeck	yes	escitalopram	SSRIs, Antidepressant	Major depressive disorder, Generalized anxiety disorder, Obsessive–compulsive disorder	adults
Clarinex RediTabs	Schering-Plough	yes	desloratadine	Antihistamines	Allergy	6 years+
Claritin RediTabs	Bayer	yes	loratadine	Antihistamines	Allergy	6 years+
DDAVP Melt	Ferring Pharmaceuticals		desmopressin	Antidiuretic	Bedwetting, Central diabetes insipidus	5 years+
Edluar	Meda AB	yes	zolpidem	Nonbenzodiazepine Hypnotics	Short-term treatment of insomnia	adults
Etizest MD	Consern		etizolam	Benzodiazepine analog/thienotriazolodiazepine	Short-term treatment of anxiety and insomnia	
FazaClo	AzurPharma	yes	clozapine	Antipsychotics	Treatment-resistant schizophrenia	adults
Fluimucil	Alpex Pharma SA / Zambon Group		N-acetylcysteine	Mucolytic	Cold and Cough	16 years+
Jr. Tylenol Meltaways	McNeil Consumer Healthcare	yes	acetaminophen	Analgesics, Antipyretics	Pain, Fever	6 years+
Kemstro	UCB Inc.	no	baclofen	Muscle relaxant, Antispastic		
Klonopin Wafers	Roche	yes	clonazepam	Benzodiazepines, Anticonvulsant, Anxiolytics	Seizure disorders	infants+
Klonopin Wafers	Roche	yes	clonazepam	Benzodiazepines, Anticonvulsant, Anxiolytics	Panic disorder	adults
Lamictal ODT	Aptalis / GlaxoSmithKline	yes	lamotrigine	Anticonvulsant, Mood stabilizer	Seizure disorders	2 years+
Lamictal ODT	Aptalis / GlaxoSmithKline	yes	lamotrigine	Anticonvulsant, Mood stabilizer	Bipolar I disorder	adults
Maxalt-MLT	Merck & Co.	yes	rizatriptan	Triptans, Serotonin agonists	Migraine	adults
meloxicam orodispersible tablets	Alpex Pharma Ltd (UK); Fontus Health Ltd (UK)		meloxicam	NSAIDs	Osteoarthritis, Rheumatoid arthritis, Ankylosing spondylitis	16 years+
Niravam	Schwarz Pharma	yes	alprazolam	Benzodiazepines, Anxiolytics	Anxiety disorder, Panic disorder	adults
Nocdurna	Ferring Pharmaceuticals		desmopressin	Antidiuretic	Nocturia	adults
NuLev	Alaven Pharmaceutical		hyoscyamine	anticholinergic / antispasmodic	Peptic ulcer, Symptoms of various gastrointestinal and urinary disorders	2 years+
Nurofen Meltlets	Reckitt Benckiser		ibuprofen	NSAIDs	Pain, Fever, Inflammation	12 years+
Orapred ODT	Sciele Pharma	yes	prednisolone	Corticosteroids	Asthma, Severe allergy, Hemolytic anaemia, Stevens–Johnson syndrome, Certain types of tuberculosis; acute treatment of arthritis, Bursitis, COPD, Leukemia, Lupus, Multiple sclerosis, Ulcerative colitis	adults and children weighing over 44 lbs/20.1 kg
Parcopa	Schwarz Pharma	yes	carbidopa/levodopa	DDC inhibitors [carbidopa], Dopamine precursor [levodopa]	Parkinson's disease	adults
Pepcid RPD	Scherer DDS / Merck	yes	famotidine	Histamine H2-receptor antagonists	duodenal ulcer, gastric ulcer, gastroesophageal reflux disease, pathological hypersecretory conditions	adults
Prevacid SoluTab	Takeda Pharmaceuticals	yes	lansoprazole	Proton pump inhibitors	Gastro-oesophageal reflux disease (GERD), Ulcers	1 year+
Propulsid Quicksolv (withdrawn)	Janssen Pharma	no	cisapride	Gastroprokinetic agent		
Reglan ODT	Meda Pharms, Schwarz Pharma	yes	metoclopramide	Antiemetics, Dopamine receptor antagonists	short-term therapy for GERD, acute diabetic gastric stasis	adults
Remeron SolTab	Merck & Co.	yes	mirtazapine	Antidepressants	Major depressive disorder	adults
Risperdal M-Tab	Janssen Pharma	yes	risperidone	Atypical antipsychotics	Schizophrenia	13 years+
Risperdal M-Tab	Janssen Pharma	yes	risperidone	Atypical antipsychotics	Bipolar disorder	10 years+
Risperdal M-Tab	Janssen Pharma	yes	risperidone	Atypical antipsychotics	Irritability associated with autistic disorder	5 years+
Rybix ODT	Victory Pharma	yes	tramadol	Opioid, SNRI	Pain	16 years+
Saphris	Merck & Co.	no	asenapine	Atypical antipsychotics	Schizophrenia, Bipolar disorder	adults
Staxyn	Bayer Healthcare	yes	vardenafil	Phosphodiesterase 5 (PDE5) inhibitor	Erectile dysfunction	adult males
Striant Buccal	Columbia Laboratories	no	testosterone	Androgen, Steroid hormone	Hypogonadism (Low testosterone)	adult males
Suboxone tablets (also available as dissolvable film)	Reckitt Benckiser	no	Buprenorphine/Naloxone	semi-synthetic opioid partial opioid agonist & inverse opioid antagonist (Naloxone is included because it deters abuse. Naloxone is poorly absorbed into the body when used by mouth or as an ODT. However, when the pill is crushed and/or filtered and injected intravenously, naloxone blocks the effects of buprenorphine.)	Opioid addiction	adults
Suprenza	Alpex Pharma / Citius	no	phentermine	Amphetamines, Anorectic	Weight control	adults
Ultram ODT	Ortho-McNeil Pharmaceutical	yes	tramadol	Opioid, SNRI	Pain	17 years+
Unisom SleepMelts	Chattem	yes	diphenhydramine	Antihistamines, Hypnotic	Insomnia	12 years+
Vometa FT	Dexamedica		domperidone	Antiemetics, Prokinetic agent	Dyspepsia, Bloating, GERD, Gastroparesis	12 years+
Zelapar	Valeant Pharmaceuticals International	no	selegiline	Monoamine oxidase B inhibitors (MAO_{B}Is)	Adjunct therapy in parkinson's disease	adults
Zofran ODT	GlaxoSmithKline	yes	ondansetron	Antiemetics	Nausea, Vomiting	4 years+
Zomig-ZMT	AstraZeneca	yes	zolmitriptan	Triptans, Serotonin agonists	Migraine	adults
Zyprexa Zydis	Eli Lilly and Company	yes	olanzapine	Atypical antipsychotics	Bipolar disorder, Schizophrenia	adults
Zyrtec	Johnson & Johnson Consumer Inc.,	yes	cetirizine	Antihistamines	Allergy	

== Advantages of ODTs ==
Ved Parkash et al. note the following advantages of ODTs:

- they are easy to consume and as such are convenient for such patients as "the elderly, stroke victims, bedridden patients, patients affected by kidney failure, and people who refuse to swallow, such as pediatric, geriatric, and psychiatric patients";
- increased bioavailability (rapid absorption) due to pregastric absorption;
- don't require water to consume and thus suitable for "patient compliant for disabled, bedridden patients, and for travelers and busy people who do not always have access to water";
- good mouth feel;
- improved safety due to low risk of choking or suffocation during oral administration.

== Disadvantages of ODTs ==
Ved Parkash et al. lists the following disadvantages of ODTs:

- cost-intensive production process;
- lack of physical resistance in standard blister packs;
- limited ability to incorporate higher concentrations of active drug.

== ODTs under development ==
Brand name (generic version)	Manufacturer	Active ingredient	Category	Indication	Intended age
citalopram ODT	Biovail	citalopram	SSRIs, Antidepressant	Major depressive disorder	
tramadol/acetaminophen ODT	Biovail	tramadol / acetaminophen	Opioid / non-opioid analgesic	Pain	adults

== See also ==
- Phagophobia - fear of swallowing
- Pnigophobia - fear of choking
- Sugar alcohol - a family of chemicals common in ODTs to enhance the mouth feel of the tablet as it disintegrates
