= Delandistrogene moxeparvovec =

Gene therapy medication

Clinical data
- Pronunciation: /ˌdɛlənˈdɪstroʊdʒiːn ˌmɒksəˈpɑːrvoʊvɛk/ DEL-ən-DIS-troh-jeen MOX-ə-PAR-voh-vek
- Trade names: Elevidys
- Other names: SRP-9001, delandistrogene moxeparvovec-rokl
- AHFS/Drugs.com: Monograph
- MedlinePlus: a623058
- License data: US DailyMed: Delandistrogene moxeparvovec
- Routes of administration: Intravenous infusion
- ATC code: M09AX15 (WHO)

Legal status
- Legal status: US: ℞-only

Identifiers
- CAS Number: 2305040-16-6
- DrugBank: DB16802
- UNII: 2P6QV2ZE52
- KEGG: D12633

Delandistrogene moxeparvovec, sold under the brand name Elevidys, is a recombinant gene therapy used for the treatment of Duchenne muscular dystrophy. It is designed to deliver into the body a gene that leads to production of Elevidys micro-dystrophin that contains selected domains of the dystrophin protein present in normal muscle cells. It is an adeno-associated virus vector-based gene therapy that is given by intravenous infusion (slow injection into a vein).

The most commonly reported side effects include vomiting, nausea, liver failure, fever, and thrombocytopenia (abnormally low platelet count in the blood).

Delandistrogene moxeparvovec was approved for medical use in the United States in June 2023. It was developed by Sarepta Therapeutics, together with Roche, and is manufactured by Catalent.

== Medical uses ==
Delandistrogene moxeparvovec is indicated for ambulatory people aged four and older with Duchenne muscular dystrophy and a confirmed DMD gene mutation. In November 2025 the FDA removed the indication for non-ambulatory patients and added a boxed warning for acute serious liver injury and acute liver failure, after two non-ambulatory boys died of acute liver failure following treatment.

Delandistrogene moxeparvovec is designed to deliver into the body a gene that leads to production of Elevidys micro-dystrophin, a shortened protein (138 kDa, compared to the 427 kDa dystrophin protein of normal muscle cells) that contains selected domains of the dystrophin protein present in normal muscle cells. FDA states that the conditional approval is based on detection of successful gene expression; evidence of clinical improvement is still pending.

In the phase III randomized clinical trial, delandistrogene moxeparvovec failed to show statistically significant motor function improvement. The study included 125 ambulatory males aged 4–8 years (63 in therapy group, 62 in placebo group).

== History ==
The accelerated US Food and Drug Administration (FDA) approval of delandistrogene moxeparvovec was based on data from a randomized clinical trial that established that delandistrogene moxeparvovec increased the expression of the designed micro-dystrophin protein in delandistrogene moxeparvovec-treated individuals aged four to five years with Duchenne muscular dystrophy.

== Society and culture ==
=== Legal status ===
In July 2025, the US Food and Drug Administration (FDA) placed Elevidys on clinical hold; and requested that Sarepta Therapeutics suspend distribution of Elevidys and pause clinical trials on other gene therapy products still in development, following the deaths of three people that had received either Elevidys or an experimental gene therapy using the same viral platform. In the three cases, the cause of death appeared to be acute liver failure. For a short time, Sarepta continued to supply the medication despite the concerns raised by the FDA. On 21 July 2025, a few days after the initial announcement, the company placed a voluntary hold on the medication in accordance with the wishes of the FDA. On 28 July 2025, the clinical hold on Elevidys was lifted by the FDA.

In July 2025, the Committee for Medicinal Products for Human Use of the European Medicines Agency recommended that the drug not be marketed in the European Union.

=== Economics ===
Initial pricing is US$3.2 million for a single treatment which is expected to last a lifetime.
