= Trazpiroben =

Chemical compound

Clinical data
- Other names: TAK-906; ATC-1906
- Drug class: Dopamine antagonist

Identifiers
- IUPAC name: 3-[[1-cyclohexyl-4-oxo-8-(4-oxo-4-phenylbutyl)-1,3,8-triazaspiro[4.5]decan-3-yl]methyl]benzoic acid
- CAS Number: 1352993-39-5
- PubChem CID: 54768846
- ChemSpider: 81367274
- UNII: FH87H57Q4Y
- ChEMBL: ChEMBL4650340

Chemical and physical data
- Formula: C_{31}H_{39}N_{3}O_{4}
- Molar mass: 517.670 g·mol^{−1}
- 3D model (JSmol): Interactive image
- SMILES: C1CCC(CC1)N2CN(C(=O)C23CCN(CC3)CCCC(=O)C4=CC=CC=C4)CC5=CC(=CC=C5)C(=O)O
- InChI: InChI=1S/C31H39N3O4/c35-28(25-10-3-1-4-11-25)15-8-18-32-19-16-31(17-20-32)30(38)33(23-34(31)27-13-5-2-6-14-27)22-24-9-7-12-26(21-24)29(36)37/h1,3-4,7,9-12,21,27H,2,5-6,8,13-20,22-23H2,(H,36,37); Key:BDXJYAAYLZTLEK-UHFFFAOYSA-N

Trazpiroben (developmental code name TAK-906) is a dopamine antagonist drug which was under development for the treatment of gastroparesis. It acts as a peripherally selective dopamine D_{2} and D_{3} receptor antagonist. The drug has been found to strongly increase prolactin levels in humans, similarly to other peripherally selective D_{2} receptor antagonists like domperidone. Clinical development of trazpiroben was discontinued before April 2022. Trazpiroben was originated by Altos Therapeutics and was under development by Takeda Oncology.

In a global phase 2b trial (NCT03544229), adults aged 18 to 85 with idiopathic or diabetic gastroparesis received oral trazpiroben 5, 25 or 50 mg, or placebo, twice daily for 12 weeks.[N1] The primary endpoint analysis found no clinically meaningful difference in efficacy between trazpiroben and placebo. The drug was well tolerated: 41.4% of participants receiving trazpiroben reported treatment-emergent adverse events, compared with 39.7% on placebo, and no serious events were considered drug-related.[N1] Prolactin levels rose in the 25 mg and 50 mg groups, consistent with the drug’s mechanism of action.[N2]

Takeda discontinued clinical development of trazpiroben in early 2022 in response to the phase 2b data.[1][N3] Trazpiroben was originated by Altos Therapeutics and was under development by Takeda
