= Sarepta Therapeutics =

American pharmaceutical company

Sarepta Therapeutics, Inc.
- Type: Public
- Traded as: Nasdaq: SRPT; S&P 600 component
- Founded: 1980; 46 years ago
- Headquarters: Cambridge, Massachusetts, U.S.
- Key people: Douglas S. Ingram (CEO & president)
- Revenue: ▲US$2.198 billion (2025)
- Net income: ▼ −US$713 million (2025)
- Number of employees: 1,314 (December 2023)
- Website: sarepta.com

Sarepta Therapeutics, Inc. is a medical research and drug development company with corporate offices and research facilities in Cambridge, Massachusetts, United States. Incorporated in 1980 as AntiVirals, shortly before going public the company changed its name from AntiVirals to AVI BioPharma soon with stock symbol AVII and in July 2012 changed name from AVI BioPharma to Sarepta Therapeutics and SRPT respectively. As of 2023, the company has four approved drugs.

== History ==
Sarepta started in Corvallis, Oregon on January 1, 1980 and was originally named Antivirals Inc. After occupying several research laboratory spaces in Corvallis, the company opened a production laboratory in Corvallis in February 2002 and was renamed AVI BioPharma Inc. The company made headlines in 2003 when it announced work on treatments for severe acute respiratory syndrome (SARS) and the West Nile virus. In July 2009, the company announced they would move their headquarters from Portland, Oregon, north to Bothell, Washington, near Seattle. At that time, the company led by president and CEO Leslie Hudson had 83 employees and quarterly revenues of $3.2 million. AVI had yet to turn a profit and had not yet developed any commercial products as of July 2009. The company lost $19.7 million in the second quarter of 2009, and then won an $11.5 million contract with the U.S. Department of Defense's Defense Threat Reduction Agency in October 2009. By this time, the company had completed its headquarters move to Bothell.

In 2012, the company moved a second time, to Cambridge, Massachusetts. At the time, CEO Chris Garabedian indicated the move was motivated by the need to recruit expertise in rare diseases. The Corvallis laboratory facility was closed in 2016.

In June 2017, Sarepta Therapeutics appointed former Allergan executive Doug Ingram as its new CEO to replace Edward Kaye who had announced plans to step down earlier that year.

In February 2019, Sarepta acquired five gene therapy candidates for $165 million after one of them, MYO-101, produced results with a new gene therapy candidate for patients with Limb-Girdle muscular dystrophy; two months after receiving a single treatment, muscles from all three patients were producing the protein they couldn't make on their own. In 2019, the FDA rejected a Serepta Duchenne muscular dystrophy drug before reversing course 3 months later.

The company opened a new Genetic Therapies Center of Excellence in Columbus, Ohio in October, 2021 in order to dramatically advance research into therapeutics for several muscular dystrophies that had begun at Nationwide Children's Hospital several years earlier. As of 2022, there are three FDA-approved DMD drugs in Sarepta Therapeutics' portfolio. In January 2023, Sarepta partnered with Catalent to manufacture delandistrogene moxeparvovec (SRP-9001).

In June 2023, the FDA approved Sarepta Therapeutics’ fourth therapy, delandistrogene moxeparvovec-rokl, the first gene therapy to treat Duchenne muscular dystrophy (DMD). The product was approved under the accelerated approval pathway for 4-5 year olds with a confirmed DMD diagnosis. Accelerated approval requires that the product be studied further to verify its clinical benefit.

In July 2025, Sarepta announced plans to lay off 500 employees, about 36% of its workforce, following the deaths of two patients linked to its Duchenne muscular dystrophy gene therapy, ELEVIDYS. The layoffs are part of a restructuring effort expected to generate around $400 million in cost savings by 2026.

== Products ==
Its primary products are based on Morpholino oligomers (PMOs), synthetic nucleic acid analogs that were conceived of by James Summerton and invented by Summerton with Dwight Weller, originally developed under the name NeuGene Antisense. Since morpholino oligomers can form sequence-specific double-stranded complexes with RNA they are suitable use in antisense therapy. In one application, translation blocking, a morpholino oligomer binds to messenger RNA produced by a known disease-causing gene to prevent it from being translated into protein. Morpholinos can also work as splice-switching oligos, targeting pre-mRNA to alter splicing and so causing changes in the structure of the mature mRNA (the mechanism of the approved drug eteplirsen). Morpholinos have been tested for a wide range of applications including prevention of cardiac restenosis after angioplasty, treatment of coronary artery bypass grafts, treatment of polycystic kidney disease, redirection of drug metabolism, treatment of some mutations causing Duchenne muscular dystrophy (DMD), and inhibition of infectious diseases. Their greatest clinical and commercial success thus far has been in the treatment of DMD. A new class of Morpholino oligos, the peptide-linked Morpholinos or PPMO, are linked to an arginine-rich cell-penetrating peptide to enhance their delivery into cells and have entered clinical trials.

The Morpholino drug eteplirsen, targeting exon 51 of the dystrophin mRNA, was approved as a human therapeutic by the FDA in 2016 and antisense oligonucleotides for Morpholinos targeting other exons are also subsequently approved. Morpholinos have been used in preclinical studies to inhibit replication of a broad range of viruses, including influenza, West Nile virus, SARS, hepatitis C, dengue fever, Ebola and Calicivirus, all of which are single stranded RNA viruses. They are in advanced development for prevention and treatment of Ebola and Marburg viruses. In March 2013, the Company announced positive results from a non-human primate study of AVI-7288, the drug candidate for treatment of Marburg virus infection. The results showed that intramuscular administration of AVI-7288 resulted in survival rates up to 100 percent in monkeys exposed to this fatal virus. These results are similar to those in previous studies when the drug was given by intravenous injection.

In December 2019, golodirsen (Vyondys 53) received US FDA approval for the treatment of cases that can benefit from skipping exon 53 of the dystrophin transcript. The other approved PMO developed by Sarepta is casimersen (AMONDYS45) which is indicated for the treatment of DMD in patients amendable by exon 45 skipping.

In addition to development of Morpholinos as therapeutics, AVI has conducted six human trials for colorectal and pancreatic cancers using their cancer vaccine AVICINE.

In 2019, Sarepta signed a licensing agreement with Roche for the development, and commercialization outside of USA, for SRP-9001. In June 2023, ELEVIDYS (Delandistrogene moxeparvovec) was approved by the FDA for use in 4-5-year-old boys with mutations in the DMD gene. The FDA granted accelerated approval to ELEVIDYS, which requires that the product be further studied to verify its clinical benefit.

In June 2024, the U.S. Food and Drug Administration expanded approval of delandistrogene moxeparvovec to include individuals with Duchenne muscular dystrophy with a confirmed mutation in the DMD gene who are at least 4 years of age. The FDA granted traditional approval for ambulatory patients and accelerated approval for non-ambulatory patients.

== See also ==
- Eteplirsen
