= Loperamide/simethicone =

Combination drug

Combination of
- Loperamide: Antidiarrheal
- Simethicone: Gas reducer

Clinical data
- Trade names: Imodium Multi-Symptom Relief, Imodium Plus, Imodium Plus Comfort
- License data: US DailyMed: Loperamide and simethicone
- Pregnancy category: AU: B3
- Routes of administration: By mouth
- ATC code: A07DA53 (WHO)

Legal status
- Legal status: UK: P (Pharmacy medicines) / GSL; US: OTC

Loperamide/simethicone is combination medication sold under the brand name Imodium Multi-Symptom Relief (formerly Imodium A-D Advanced) used to treat diarrhea and gas simultaneously. It is manufactured by the McNeil Consumer Healthcare Division of McNeil PPC, Inc. It contains loperamide and simethicone.

Loperamide is a μ-opioid receptor agonist that works in the intestines. Although it is an opioid, it has no effects on the central nervous system. It reduces diarrhea by slowing the transit time of contents through the intestinal tract thereby allowing more water to be reabsorbed from the intestinal lumen.

Simethicone reduces gas by allowing smaller gas bubbles to coalesce into larger bubbles in the intestinal tract, making them easier to pass. Simethicone is not absorbed from the gastrointestinal tract so there are no systemic side effects.
