= Oncofetal antigen =

Protein type

Oncofetal antigens are proteins which are typically present only during fetal development but are found in adults with certain kinds of cancer. These proteins are often measurable in the blood of individuals with cancer and may be used to both diagnose and follow treatment of the tumors. One example of an oncofetal antigen is alpha-fetoprotein, which is produced by hepatocellular carcinoma and some germ cell tumors. Another example is carcinoembryonic antigen, which is elevated in people with colon cancer and other tumors. Other oncofetal antigens are trophoblast glycoprotein precursor and immature laminin receptor protein (also known as oncofetal antigen protein). Oncofetal antigens are promising targets for vaccination against several types of cancers.
