= Catalent =

American pharmaceutical company

Catalent, Inc.
- Type: Private
- Traded as: NYSE: CTLT (2014–2024)
- Industry: Pharmaceuticals
- Predecessor: Cardinal Health PTS
- Founded: 2007; 19 years ago
- Headquarters: Tampa, Florida, U.S.
- Number of locations: 53 (2024)
- Key people: Alessandro Maselli; (President & CEO); John Greisch (Chairman)
- Services: Drug pre-formulation, formulation, analytical testing, clinical and commercial manufacturing, clinical packaging and supply chain, regulatory consulting
- Revenue: ▲US$4.38 billion (2024)
- Operating income: ▼US$−749 million (2024)
- Net income: ▼US$−1.04 billion (2024)
- Total assets: ▼US$9.75 billion (2024)
- Total equity: ▼US$3.60 billion (2024)
- Number of employees: 16,900 (2024)
- Parent: Novo Holdings A/S
- Website: catalent.com
- Footnotes; Financials as of June 30, 2024.

Catalent, Inc. (Catalent Pharma Solutions), is an American pharmaceutical company headquartered in Tampa, Florida. It operates as a privately held independent subsidiary of Novo Holdings A/S. It is a provider of drug delivery technologies, drug development, drug manufacturing, biologics, gene therapy, and consumer health products. It has over 50 facilities on four continents and has supported more than half the products approved by the Food and Drug Administration in the last ten years. Annually, it produces 70 billion doses for 8,000 products. The company's major customers include Bayer, Bristol-Myers Squibb, GlaxoSmithKline, Haleon, Novo Nordisk, Moderna, Pfizer, and Sarepta Therapeutics.

== History ==
=== Before 2007 ===
In 1996, Cardinal Health acquired PCI of Philadelphia, Pennsylvania, a pharmaceutical contract packing service for commercial and clinical packaging.

In 1998, Cardinal Health acquired R.P. Scherer Corporation of Troy, Michigan for $2.2 billion; it was founded by Robert Pauli Scherer to commercialize his innovation of softgel encapsulation using the rotary die production process.

In 1999, Cardinal Health acquired Automatic Liquid Packaging of Woodstock, Illinois, thereby entering the sterile product market with blow fill seal technology.

In January 2001, Cardinal Health acquired International Processing Corporation, a company that was renowned for its expertise in oral modified-release dosage form development and manufacturing, for $40 million. In April 2002, Cardinal Health acquired Magellan Laboratories, a company that specialized in product development expertise.

In October 2003, Cardinal Health acquired Gala Biotech of Madison, Wisconsin for $15.5 million.

It also acquired Intercare Group of the UK for $530 million, broadening its global capabilities in Europe.

=== 2007–2019 ===
In April 2007, the pharmaceutical technologies and services segment of Cardinal Health was acquired by affiliates of The Blackstone Group and re-branded as Catalent Pharma Solutions.

In February 2012, Catalent acquired Aptuit, a clinical supply company. As part of the deal, Catalent gained three sites in the US, two in the UK, and one in Singapore. Catalent also acquired all remaining shares for the R.P Scherer site in Eberbach, Germany.

In March 2013, Catalent continued the global expansion of its Softgel capabilities through a joint venture with Zhejiang Jaing Yuan Tang Biotechnology, a China-based company, and Relthy Laboratories in Brazil.

In July 2014, Catalent became a public company via an initial public offering on the New York Stock Exchange, raising $870 million.

In November 2014, Catalent acquired Micron Technologies, a provider of particle size engineering technologies, expanding its portfolio of drug delivery technologies.

In September 2016, Catalent acquired Pharmatek Laboratories to add spray drying capabilities.

In October 2016, Catalent licensed the anti-body drug conjugate (ADC) to Triphase Accelerator to help with oncology development,

In September 2017, Catalent agreed to acquire Cook Pharmica for $950 million, expanding its biologic manufacturing.

In July 2018, Catalent acquired Juniper Pharmaceuticals for $133 million.

In March 2019, Catalent invested more than $27 million to commercialize Zydis Ultra. The investment includes new Zydis lines; changes to facilities in Swindon, UK; and a custom suite for commercial equipment.

In September 2018, Catalent partnered with GB Sciences to develop a cannabinoid-derived medicine for Parkinson's disease utilizing the Zydis delivery method.

In May 2019, Catalent acquired Paragon Bioservices for $1.2 billion to expand its gene-therapy manufacturing capabilities. By October 2019, Paragon's employee count doubled since the April acquisition.

=== 2020–present ===
In January 2020, Catalent purchased a manufacturing facility located in Anagni, Italy, from Bristol-Myers Squibb, to manufacture and package biologic and oral solid dose products for multiple companies.

In February 2020, Catalent agreed to acquire MaSTherCell, a Belgian gene and cell therapy manufacturer, for $315 million, to expand into cell therapy development.

In 2020, Catalent partnered with multiple drugmakers, including Pfizer, Johnson & Johnson, AstraZeneca, and Moderna to provide manufacturing, vial filling and packaging capabilities for COVID-19 vaccines. In the partnership with AstraZeneca, Catalent provided manufacturing from its Maryland facility and vial filling and packaging from its Italian facility. Catalent also partnered with ViralClear to manufacture a COVID-19 treatment candidate at Catalent's facility in St. Petersburg, Florida.

In August 2021, Catalent acquired German gene therapy development firm Rheincell Therapeutics. That month, Catalent also acquired Bettera Holdings, a nutritional supplement company, for $1 billion to provide capability to manufacture vitamins, minerals and supplements in gummy form.

In October 2021, Catalent opened a 6,000 square-meter clinical supply facility in Shiga, Japan.

In August 2022, the company acquired Metrics Contract Services, a contract manufacturing organization, for $475 million.

In October 2022, Catalent announced a $12M expansion at a Kansas City, Missouri facility.

In January 2023, Catalent partnered with Sarepta Therapeutics to manufacture delandistrogene moxeparvovec (SRP-9001). Sarepta's most advanced gene therapy candidate for the treatment of Duchenne muscular dystrophy (DMD).

In December 2024, Novo Holdings A/S acquired Catalent for $16.5 billion. As part of the transaction, Novo Nordisk acquired three manufacturing facilities from parent Novo Holdings for $11 billion to scale up production to meet the demand of Wegovy and Ozempic.

== Financials ==
Annual Financial Table
#	2016	2017	2018	2019	2020	2021	2022	2023
Sales/Revenue ($ billions)	1.85	2.08	2.46	2.52	3.09	3.998	4.828	4.863
Total Current Assets ($ billions)	3.09	2.45	4.53	6.18	7.78	9.112	10.507	10.777
Net Operating Cash Flow ($ millions)	155.3	299.5	374.5	247.7	440.3	585	519	−256
