= Robert Pauli Scherer =

Robert Pauli Scherer (1906–1960) was an American inventor who founded the RP Sherer Corporation.

In 1933, Scherer invented the rotary die encapsulation process, revolutionizing the soft-gelatin encapsulation field. He founded the R. P. Scherer Corporation to commercialize his invention. R.P. Scherer was acquired by Cardinal Health, Inc. in 1998. and subsequently named Catalent Pharma Solutions.
