= Lalique =

French glass making company

- Company type: Privately held company
- Industry: Glass art; Decorative arts; Luxury goods
- Founded: 1888 in Paris, France
- Founder: René Lalique
- Owner: Art & Fragrance
- Website: www.lalique.com

Lalique is a French luxury glassmaker, founded by glassmaker and jeweller René Lalique in 1888. Lalique produced glass art, including perfume bottles, vases, and hood ornaments during the early twentieth century. Following the death of René, Lalique transitioned to producing lead glass (crystal) works during the 1950s while under the direction of René's son, Marc Lalique. In 2010, Lalique was purchased by a Swiss company named Art & Fragrance SA, now known as Lalique Group SA.

== History ==
René Lalique (1860–1945) began his career as a jewellery apprentice at the age of 16, and by 1881 he was a freelance designer for many of the best-known Parisian jewellers. In 1885, he opened his own workshop on Place Gaillon in Paris, the former workshop of Jules Destape. In 1887, Lalique opened a business on Rue du Quatre-Septembre, and registered the "RL" mark the following year. In 1890, he opened a shop in the Opera District of Paris. Within a decade, Lalique was amongst the best-known Parisian jewellers.

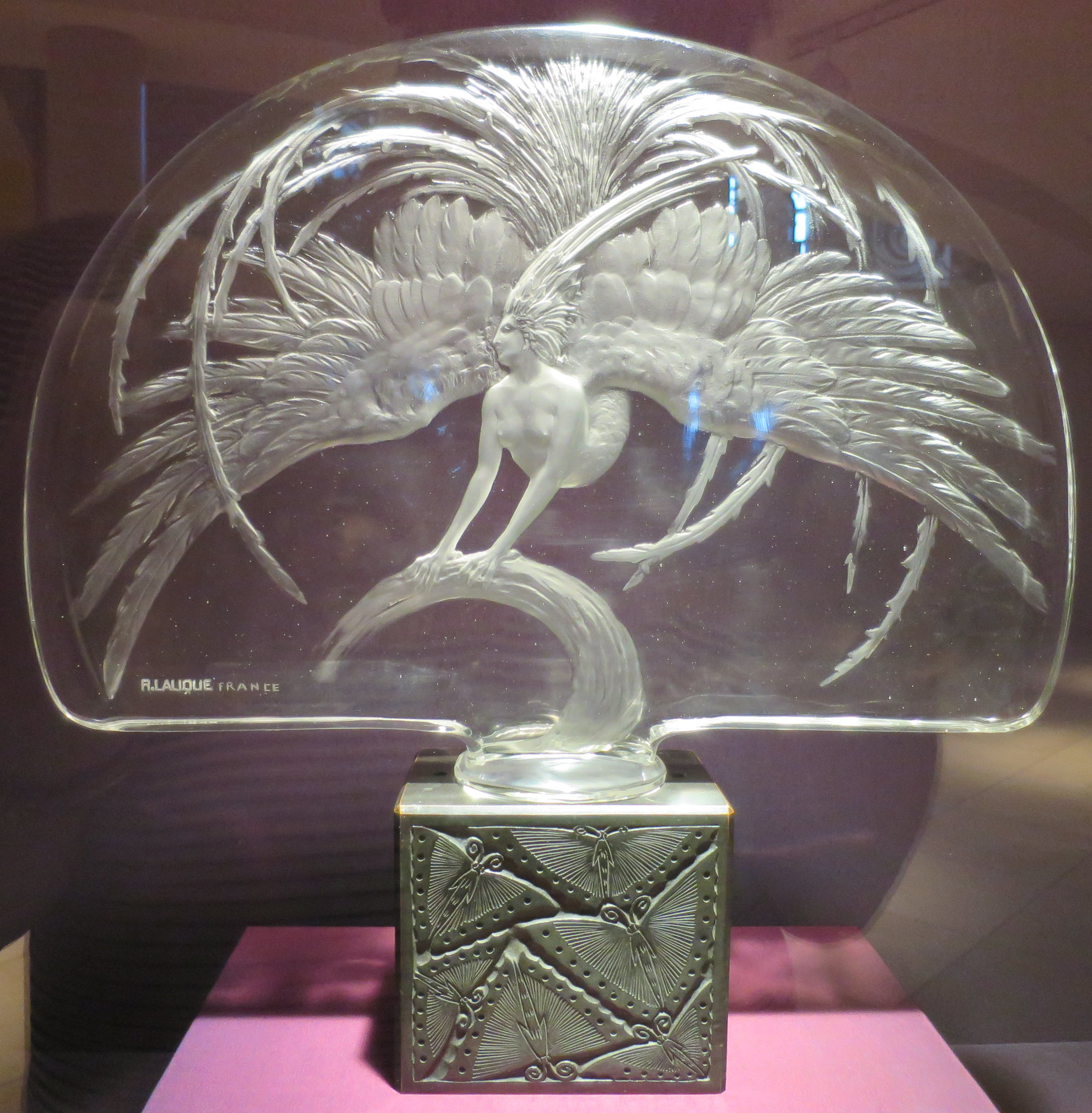
Oiseau de Feu (Firebird), 1922

In 1905, Lalique opened a new shop at Place Vendôme which exhibited not only jewellery, but glass works as well. It was close to the shop of renowned perfumer François Coty; in 1907, Lalique began producing ornate perfume bottles for Coty. The production of glass objects began at his country villa in 1902, and continued there until at least 1912. The first Lalique glassworks opened in 1909 in a rented facility in Combs-la-Ville, which Lalique later purchased in 1913. In December 1912, Lalique hosted an exhibition of Lalique Glass—as his glass would come to be known—at the Place Vendôme shop. During the First World War, the glassworks produced mundane items in support of the war effort. In 1919, work began on a new production facility in Wingen-sur-Moder, which opened in 1921. From 1925 to 1931, Lalique produced 29 models of hood ornaments; a mermaid statuette first produced in 1920 was also later sold as a hood ornament. During the 1920s and 1930s, Lalique was amongst the world's most renowned glassmakers.

René Lalique died in 1945. His son Marc Lalique took over the business, operating initially as "M.Lalique" and later as "Cristal Lalique". Under Marc's leadership, the company transitioned from producing its famous Lalique Glass to producing lead glass, commonly known as crystal. Marie-Claude Lalique took control of the company following Marc's death in 1977. It was sold to Pochet in 1994 and to a partnership of Art & Fragrance and the holding company Financière Saint-Germain in 2008. Since 2010, Cristal Lalique has been wholly owned by Art & Fragrance, who rebranded in 2016 as Lalique Group. The company is ultimately owned by Silvio Denz, an entrepreneur and Swiss national.

== Works ==
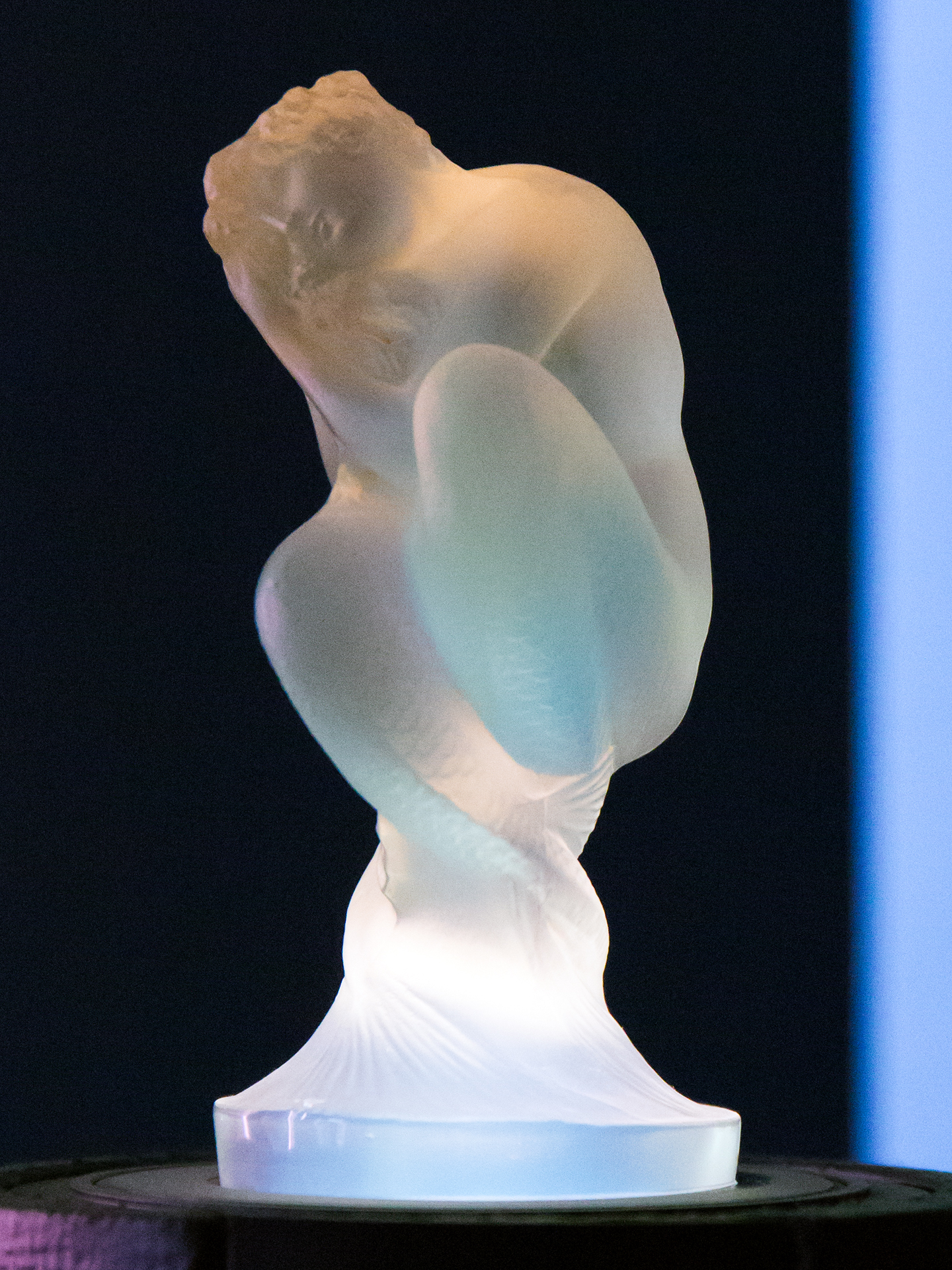
Sirene (statuette/hood ornament), 1920

Today, Lalique produces an array of luxury products in five main categories: jewellery, decorative items, interior design, perfumes, and art. The company is best known for the production of artistic glass works and fragrances such as Lalique Encre Noire, primarily using crystal (lead glass) since the mid-twentieth century. Perfumes (since 1992) and non-glass decorative items and art (since 2011) are recent additions to Lalique's product line. Reproductions of designs by René Lalique have increased since 2009.

From its founding until the 1900s–1910s, Lalique was one of France's foremost Art Nouveau jewellery designers. Famous for designs combining precious stones and metals with non precious materials such as horn, glass and enamel. In the first two decades of the twentieth century, Lalique transitioned into one of the world's most renowned makers of artistic glass objects. During the first half of the twentieth century, Lalique produced perfume bottles, vases (about 300 designs), hood ornaments (30 designs), and decorative glass works, such as inkwells, bookends, and paperweights. Sometimes collaborating with his daughter Suzanne Lalique, Lalique also designed several interiors, incorporating copious amounts of glass, including interiors for: the SS Paris, the SS Ile de France, the SS Normandie, Orient Express railroad cars, Peace Hotel (Shanghai), Oviatt Building (Los Angeles), and St Matthew's Church (Jersey).

== Factory ==
The company's sole production facility is the Cristallerie Lalique in Wingen-sur-Moder. It was opened in 1921 as the Verrerie d'Alsace (Alsace Glassworks) and given its present name in 1962.
