= SS Paris (1916) =

French ocean liner in service 1916-1939

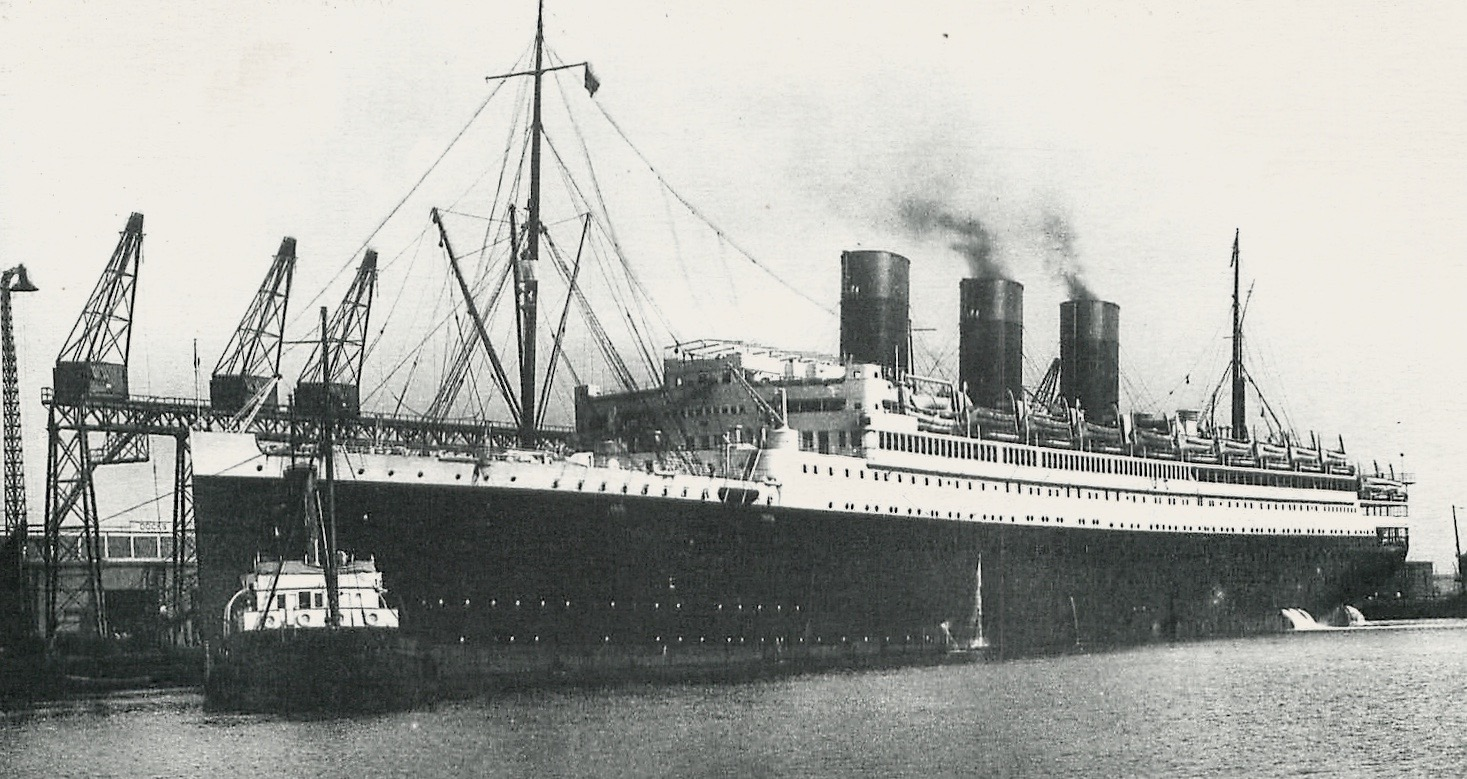
- SS Paris in port

History

France
- Name: SS Paris
- Namesake: Paris, France
- Owner: Compagnie Générale Transatlantique
- Port of registry: Le Havre, France
- Route: Le Havre, France - New York, USA
- Builder: Penhoët, Saint Nazaire, France
- Yard number: 68
- Laid down: 1913
- Launched: 12 September 1916
- Maiden voyage: 15 June 1921
- In service: 15 June 1921
- Refit: 1929
- Stricken: 1939
- Home port: Le Havre, France
- Nickname(s): "Aristocrat of the Atlantic"
- Fate: Caught fire, and capsized in Le Havre on 18 April 1939, Scrapped in 1947

General characteristics
- Type: Ocean liner
- Tonnage: 34,569 GRT, 15,333 NRT
- Displacement: 36,695
- Length: 768 ft (234 m)
- Beam: 85 ft (26 m)
- Draft: 31 ft (9.4 m)
- Depth: 68 ft (21 m)
- Decks: 10
- Propulsion: 4 Parson's Turbines 46,000 hp
- Speed: 23 knots (43 km/h; 26 mph)
- Range: 8,000 miles (13,000 km) radius
- Boats & landing craft carried: 54 Lifeboats, 1 Motorboat, 2 Service boats
- Capacity: 3,241; 563 first class; 468 second class; 2,210 third class
- Crew: 657

SS Paris was a French ocean liner built for the Compagnie Générale Transatlantique by Chantiers de l'Atlantique in Saint-Nazaire, France. Although Paris was laid down in 1913, her launching was delayed until 1916, and she was not completed until 1921, due to World War I. When Paris was finally completed, she was the largest liner under the French flag, at 34,569 tons. While smaller in size compared to the RMS Aquitania, the Olympic-class or the Imperator-class ships and not intended to challenge the speed record of the Mauretania, the Paris, operated by the Cie Generale Transatlantique, was one of the finest liners put into service at the time. She was 768 feet long, 86 feet beam and 60 feet deep. On 31 feet draught, she displaced 36,700 metric tons

== History ==
The Paris was intended to be the second of four new ocean liners which CGT entered into an agreement with the French government to build in November 1912. The agreement was partly prompted by the successful introduction of the SS France earlier that year. In return for mail subsidies from the French government, CGT planned to introduce the four new vessels in five-year intervals between 1912 and 1931. The plan was disrupted because of the First World War; after the war ended the agreement was revised so that CGT was obligated to build only three ships, the first of which was Paris.

The construction of Paris began in the Penhoët shipyards, in Saint-Nazaire, in 1913. She was launched on September 12, 1916, mainly because her slipway was needed for more urgent war purposes. She sat in Quiberon Bay until 1919, when work resumed. When completed, she was the largest French ocean liner afloat. She made her first crossing between Le Havre and New York on June 15, 1921, with Marshal Foch on board.

On 15 October 1927 in New York Harbor she ran into the Norwegian Besseggen of Skien that was at anchor on the road. This collision resulted in the loss of six Norwegian lives. All blame was put on the officers of Paris. On 7 April 1929, Paris ran aground in New York Harbor; she was refloated 36 hours later. On 18 April 1929, she ran aground again, this time on the Eddystone Rocks, Cornwall, United Kingdom. She was refloated two hours later, then anchored off Penlee, Cornwall, where 157 of her passengers were taken off by a tender and landed at Plymouth, Devon. She was severely damaged by fire at Le Havre, Seine-Maritime, France, on 20 August 1929, but repairs started on 11 September 1929. She also received a major overhaul and returned to service after being immobilized for six months.

During her career, she made crossings between New York and Le Havre, as well as cruises in the Caribbean and the Mediterranean. Following the entry into service of the SS Normandie, the Compagnie Générale Transatlantique planned to operate Paris exclusively for cruises. However, on 18 April 1939 while she was moored in Le Havre a fire broke out in the ship's bakery and she capsized on the following day due to the quantity of water the firemen had used to extinguish the fire.

== Engines ==
Designed originally to burn coal, it was decided in 1920 to make her an oil burner, and she carried 6,161 metric tons of fuel oil in double bottom and special tanks.

She had 15 double ended 8 furnace Scotch boilers, 17 feet 8 Inches diameter and 27 feet 5 Inches long, designed for a working pressure of 215 pounds and with a total heating surface of 37.620 square feet. They burn oil on the Howden Forced Draft system.

The four Parsons turbines developed 46,000 shaft horsepower and drive four propellers. The high pressure and intermediate pressure turbines were outboard, one on each side in separate compartments, and the two low-pressure elements were side by side in the large engine room amidships. These two were used for maneuvering and the arrangement of valves.

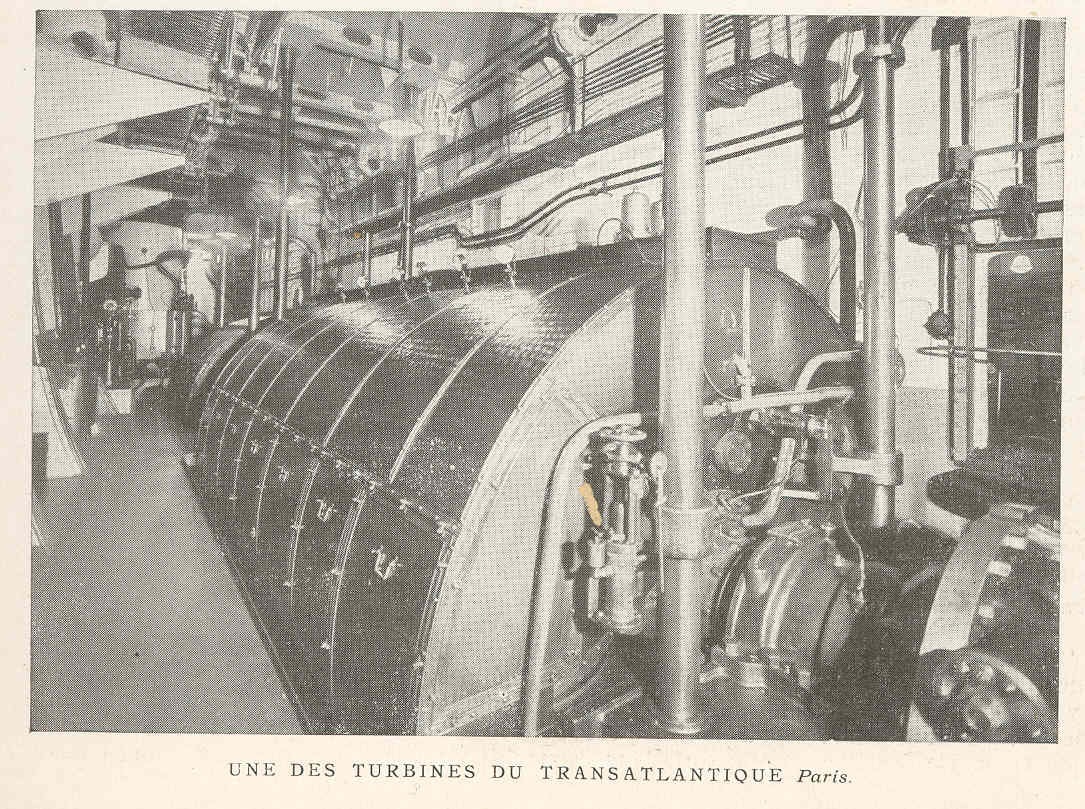
One of the Parsons turbines on board Paris

Abaft the engine room was a compartment containing the electric plant, three turbo generators of 450 KW each and a group of reserve sets of 60 KW each driven by oil engines.

== Interior ==
At the time of her entry into service, the Paris "was hailed as one of the most luxurious liners on the Atlantic with facilities that no other liner could claim." Paris's interior reflected the transitional period of the early twenties, between the earlier preferred Jacobean, Georgian, Baroque, and Palladian themes that were used in earlier liners built before World War I. Paris' interiors were also a fusion of Art Nouveau and Art Deco. Many important early French Art Deco designers worked on the interiors and furnishings such as Louis Süe, Paul Follot, René Lalique, Suzanne Lalique-Haviland and Rene Prou.

The painter Albert Besnard decorated the dining room with "La Gloire de Paris" and Georges Paul Leroux made a large decorative panel for the smoking room: "Le Jardin du Luxembourg". The painter decorator Adrien Karbowsky also participated in the decoration of the ship's library, without forgetting Lalique. The decorating architect Louis Süe participated in the decoration of this liner.

The First-Class accommodations on Paris consisted of 141 single-berth staterooms, 163 double-berth, and 32 with room for 3 people. In addition, there were 89 suites consisting of bedrooms, drawing room, and bathroom. First-Class staterooms had novel features like private telephones, and most had square windows instead of portholes. The First-Class dining room occupied three decks at its center, with the main level on E-Deck and balconies on D-Deck. The room was topped by a softly illuminated glass ceiling and entered by means of an imperial staircase with a mirrored background.

On B-Deck were a series of public rooms including two saloons, the main First-Class staircase, and a reading room and library. The forward saloon, called the "Grand Salon de Conversation", was 75 ft. long x 45 ft. wide, with a 21 ft. high ceiling.

== Loss ==
On 18 April 1939, Paris caught fire while docked in Le Havre and capsized and sank in her berth. The wreck temporarily blocked the new superliner Normandie from exiting dry dock and the funnels and masts of Paris had to be cut off to allow the newer liner to exit. The wreck of Paris remained at that spot through World War II, for almost a decade. A year after the war had ended, in 1946, the 50,000-ton German liner Europa was handed over to the French Line as compensation for Normandie and renamed Liberté. While Liberté was being refitted in Le Havre, a December gale tore the ship from her moorings and threw her into the half-submerged wreck of Paris. She settled quickly, but in an upright position. Six months later Liberté was refloated and by spring 1947 she was in St. Nazaire for her final rebuilding. The wreck of Paris remained on the spot until 1947, when she finally was scrapped on site.

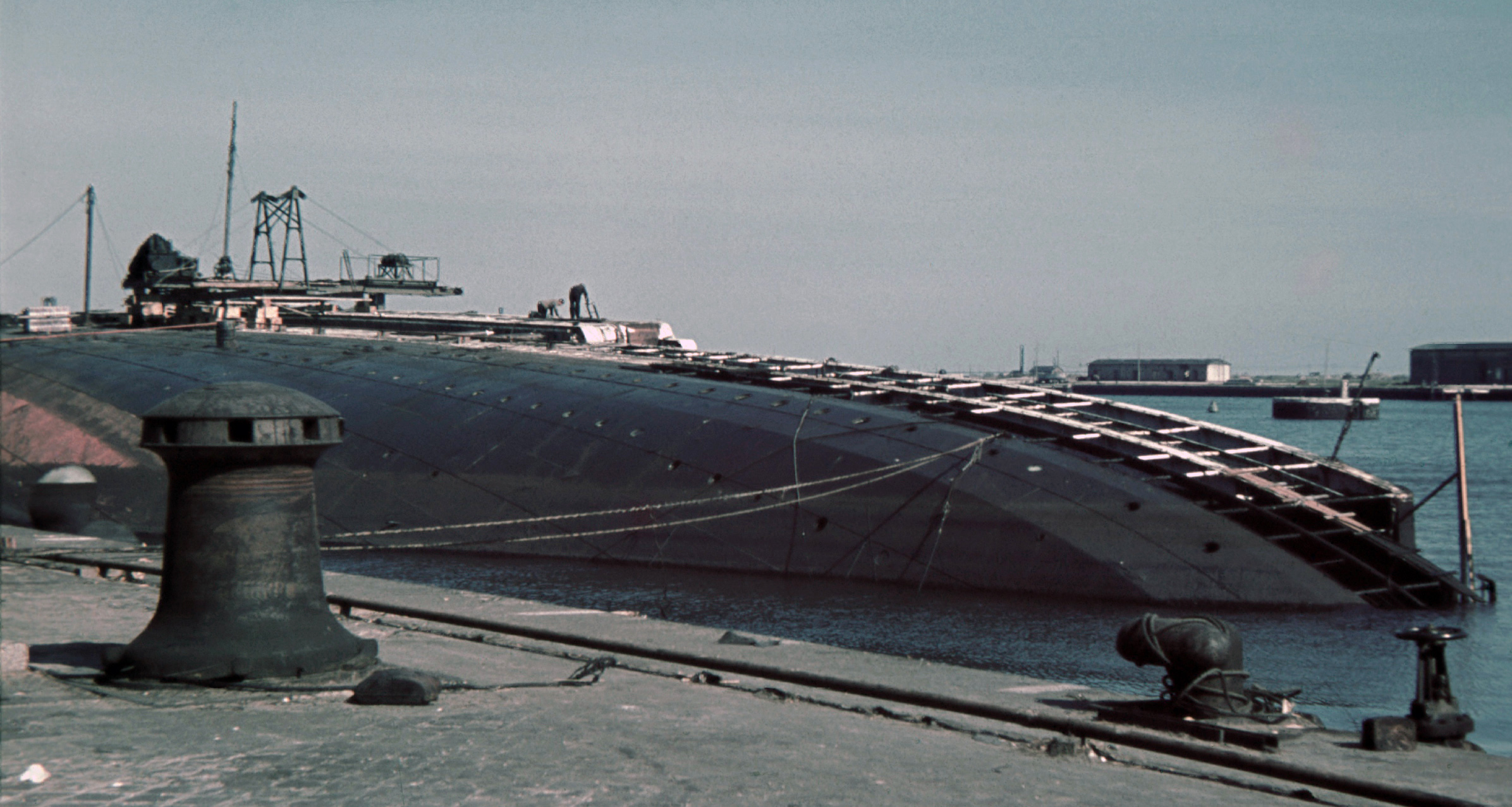
Paris capsized in Le Havre, 1941
