= Suzanne Lalique-Haviland =

French painter, designer (1892-1989)

- Born: Suzanne Renée Ledru; 4 May 1892; Paris, France
- Died: 16 April 1989 (aged 96); Avignon, France
- Burial place: Yzeures-sur-Creuse, France
- Other name: Suzanne Lalique
- Occupations: Painter, interior designer, costumes and set designer for the Comédie-Française
- Spouse: Paul Haviland
- Children: 2
- Father: René Lalique

Suzanne Lalique (born 4 May 1892 – 16 April 1989) was a French painter, interior designer and creator of costumes and sets for the Comédie-Française. With her famous father, she created the interior design of the first-class lounges of the SS Paris ocean liner in 1921, and for the Côte d'Azur Pullman Express, in 1929.

== Biography ==
She was the daughter of René Lalique, a French master glassmaker and jeweler of the Art Nouveau and Art Deco styles. Her mother was Augustine-Alice Ledru, which made Suzanne the granddaughter of sculptor Auguste Ledru. She is also the sister of Marc Lalique who was responsible for the move from glass to crystal in the early 1950s. After her mother's early death in 1909, her father encouraged Suzanne to express her talents as a designer. He regularly called on her for her creativity and judgment. Suzanne designed flasks and powder boxes for his company the Maison Lalique and the Manufacture de Sèvres, either on her own or in collaboration with her father. In 1913, she exhibited for the first time at the Salon des artistes décorateurs watercolors and models for fabric prints.

She was supported in her work by Louise and Eugène Morand, future director of the École Nationale des Arts Décoratifs, and she developed in a quasi-familial setting alongside Paul Morand and Jean Giraudoux. Eugène Morand introduced her to oil painting. Giraudoux introduced her to the works of Édouard Manet. She lived part of the year at the Prieuré de la Mothe, in Yzeures, where she enjoyed entertaining young painters such as Raymond Legueult, Eugène Morand's student at the Arts-Déco style.

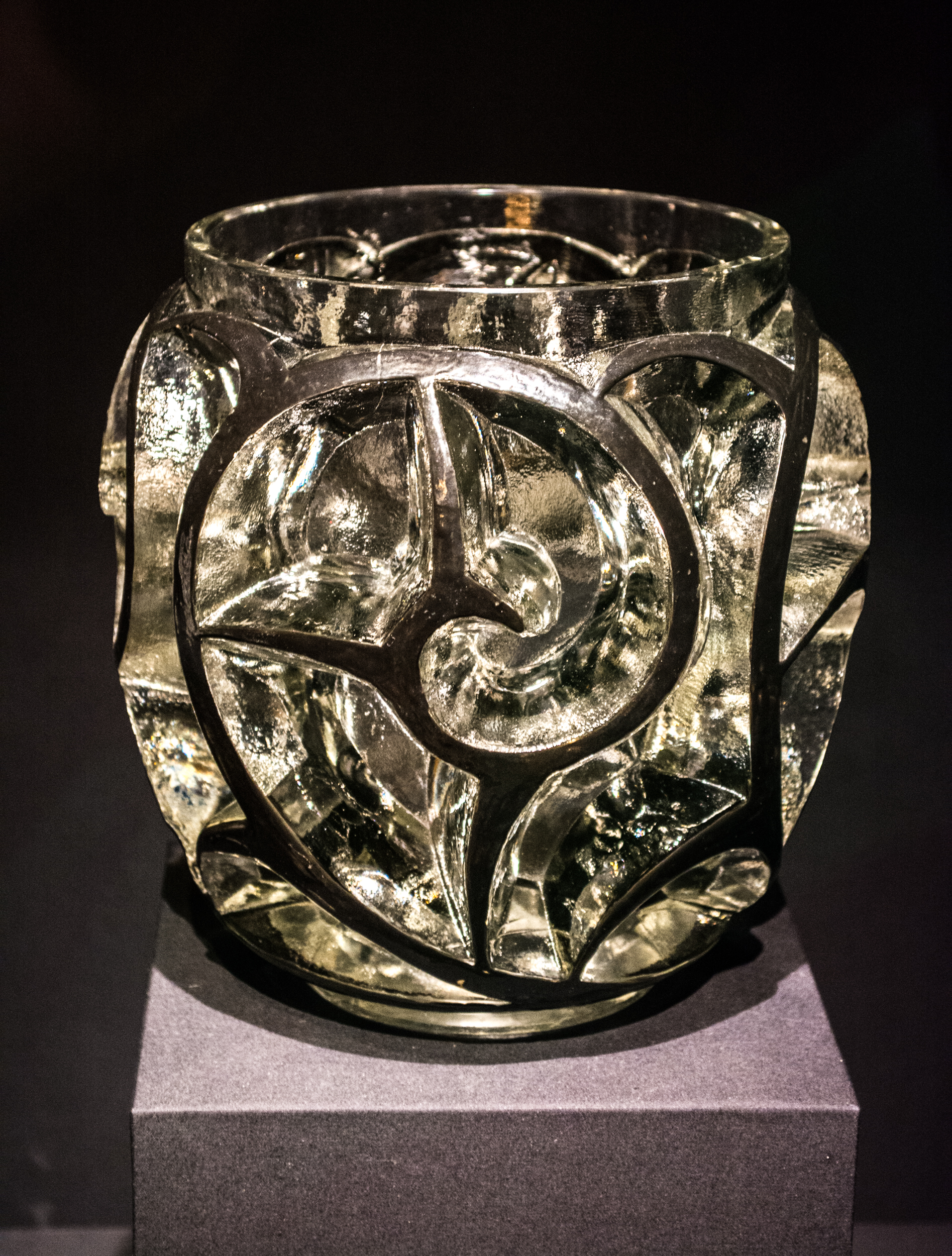
Vase by Suzanne Lalique, named "Tourbillons" (Whirlwind), of pressed, carved, acid-etched, and enameled glass. Exhibited at the Paris exposition in 1925.

Through her marriage to photographer Paul Burty Haviland in 1917, Suzanne joined another family of artists. Her brother-in-law, Franck Burty Haviland was a painter and friend of Picasso; her father-in-law, Charles Edward Haviland, a Limoges porcelain industrialist for Haviland & Co. For the Théodore Haviland factory, run by her husband's cousin, Suzanne began creating her dinner services in 1925. Suzanne continued to design Limoges porcelain until the 1930s.

However, Suzanne did not forget Maison Lalique, where Paul Haviland supported his father-in-law in the development of his glassware and photographed his work for the sales catalogs. In addition to creating decorative objects, Suzanne and her father also combined their talents in interior design, in particular for the first-class lounges of the SS Paris ocean liner in 1921, and for the Côte d'Azur Pullman Express, in 1929.

In 1930, the Bernheim-Jeune Gallery devoted its first exhibition to the paintings of Suzanne Lalique. Her pictorial universe was nourished by her everyday environment. Simple in subject, her paintings are striking for the refinement of their chromatic palette, the vigor of their brushwork and the boldness of their framing. Her last works, populated by the props and atmospheres of the theater, were presented in 1973 at the Galerie rue du Dragon, Paris.

From 1937, Suzanne turned her attention to the theater, first at the request of playwright Édouard Bourdet, then Charles Dullin. As director of decorations and costumes, until 1971, she stamped her own style on the Comédie-Française and worked on more than 50 performances between the 1930s and 1970s. She also collaborated on projects outside that prestigious establishment, in particular on the initiative of Jean Meyer in the field of theater and Francis Poulenc in opera. She also collaborated with Jean Meyer regularly for the Théâtre des Célestins, in Lyon, until 1985.

She died in Avignon on 16 April 1989 and is buried with her husband in Yzeures-sur-Creuse.
