= Hood ornament =

Car company or car model symbol placed on the front center of hood

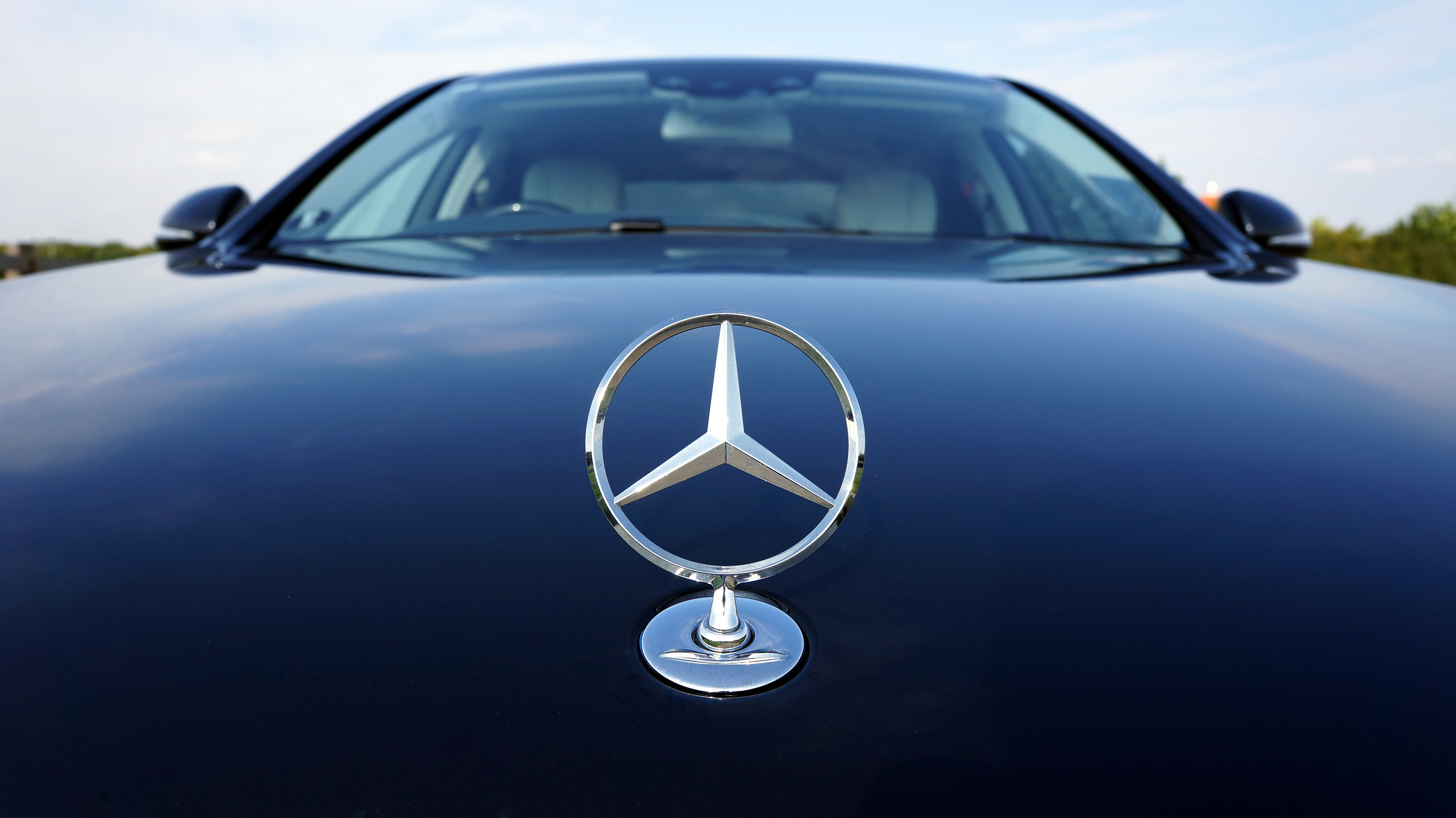
Mercedes-Benz hood ornament

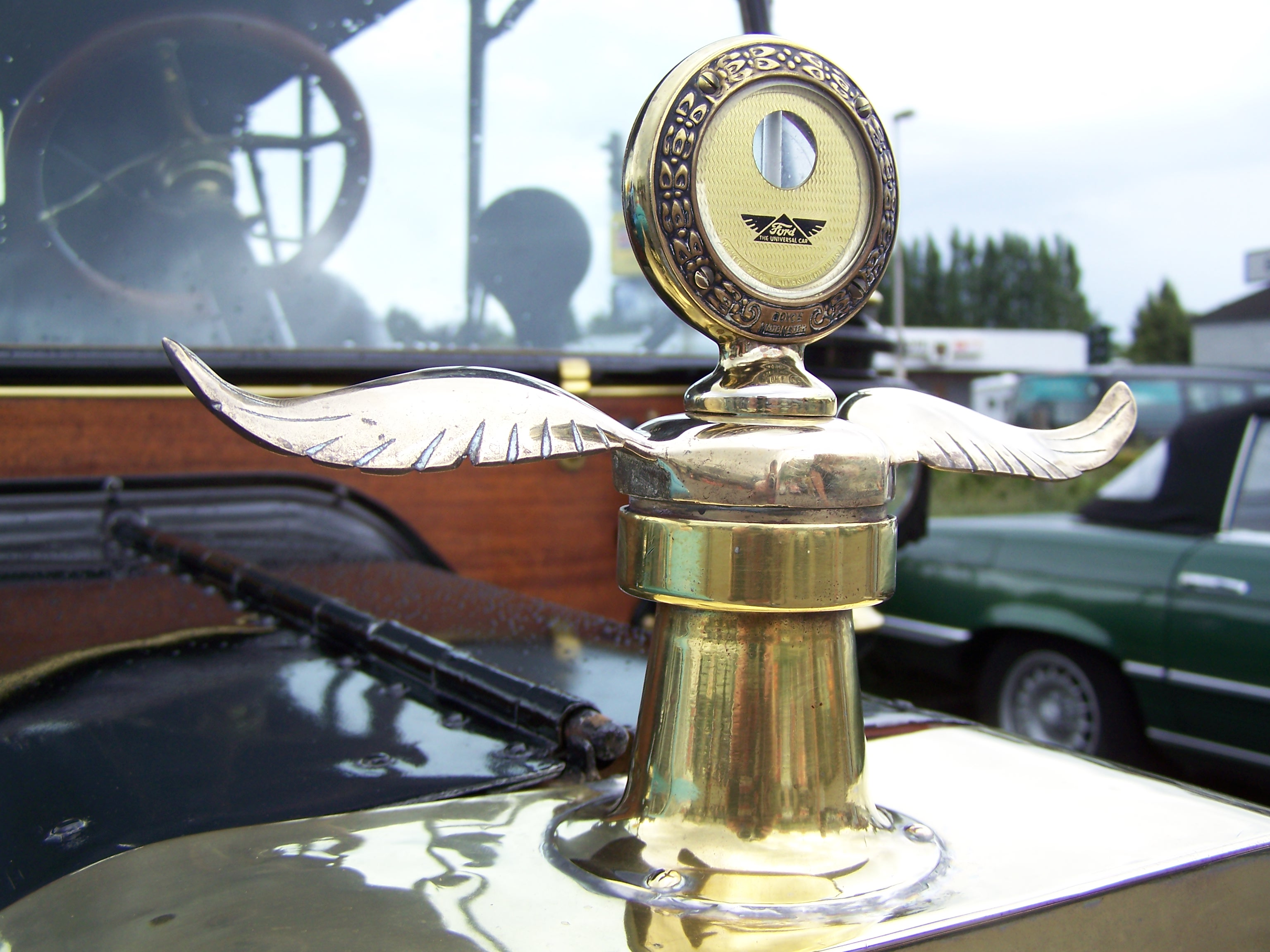
Boyce MotoMeter, circa 1914

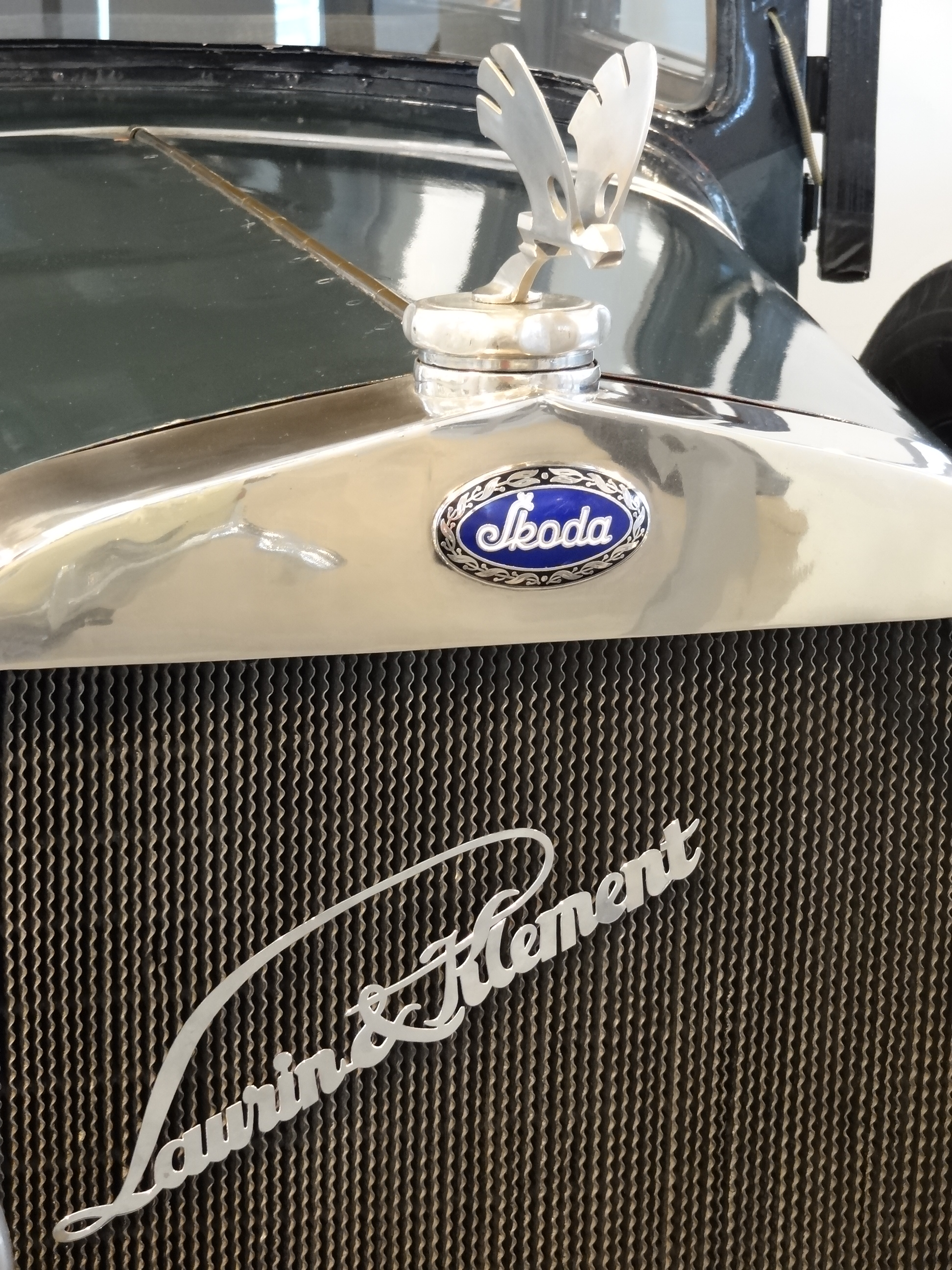
1925 Laurin & Klement-Škoda 110

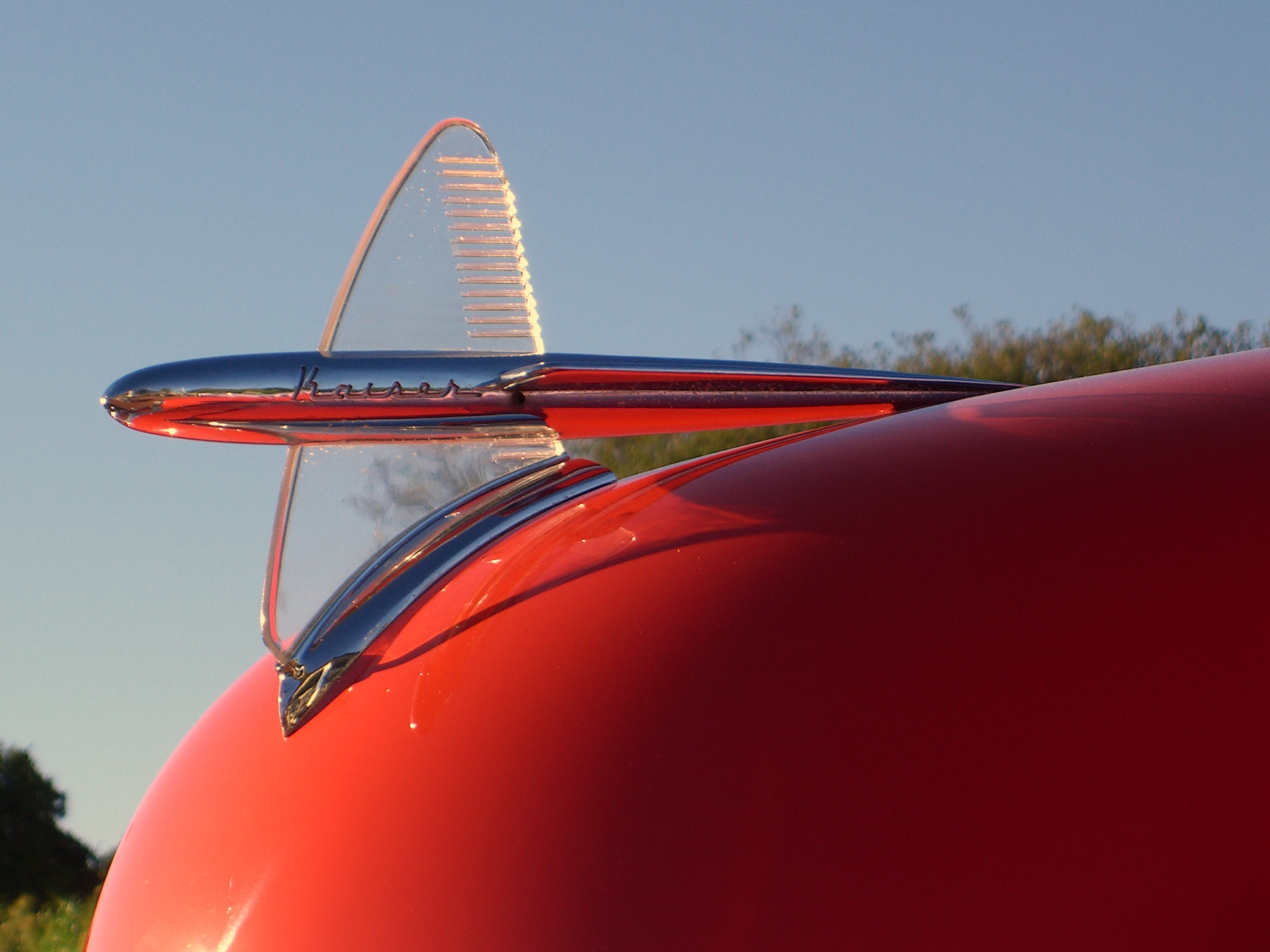
1949 Kaiser Virginian

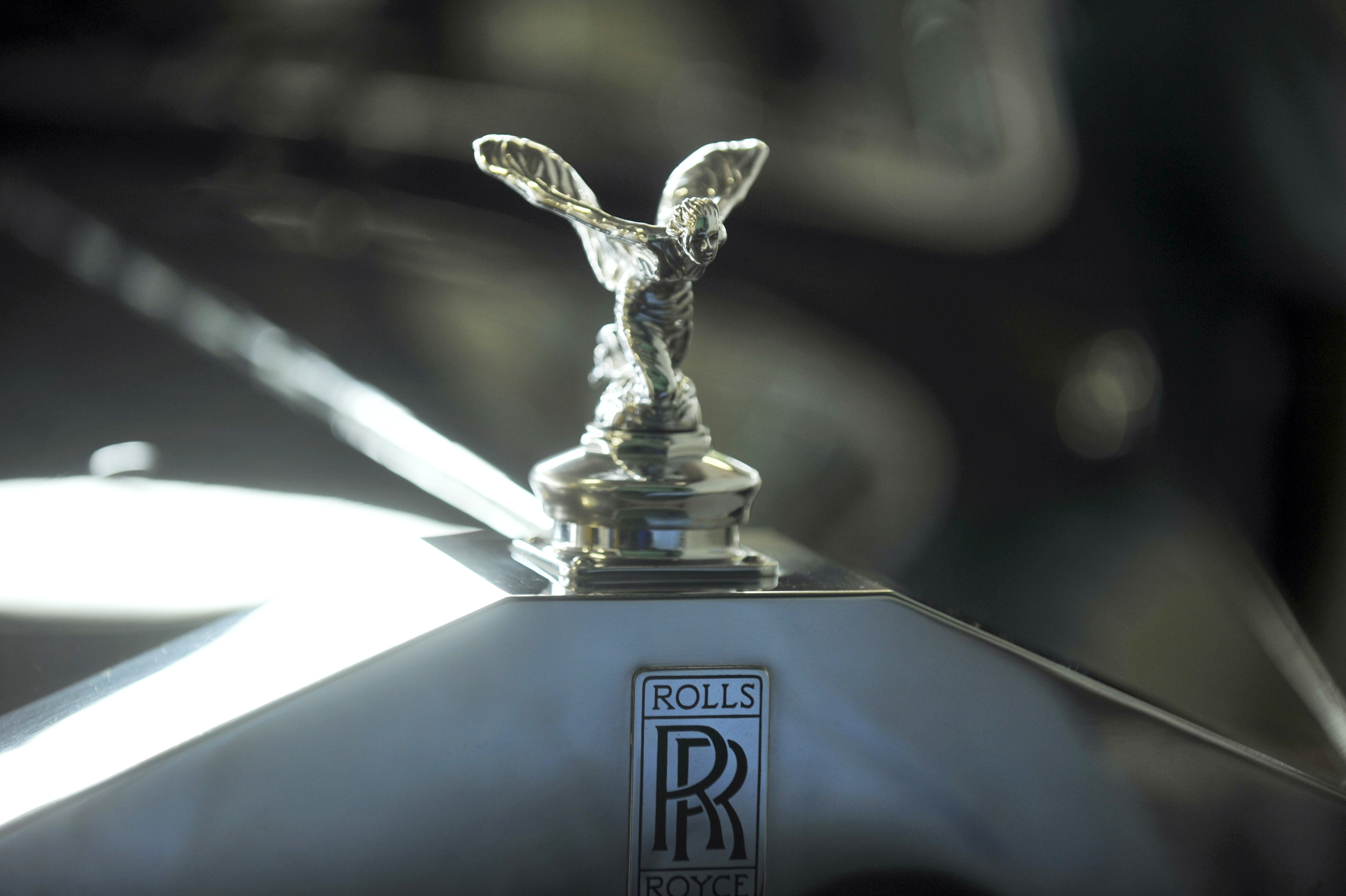
The Spirit of Ecstasy (kneeling version) on the 1952 Brazilian presidential Rolls-Royce

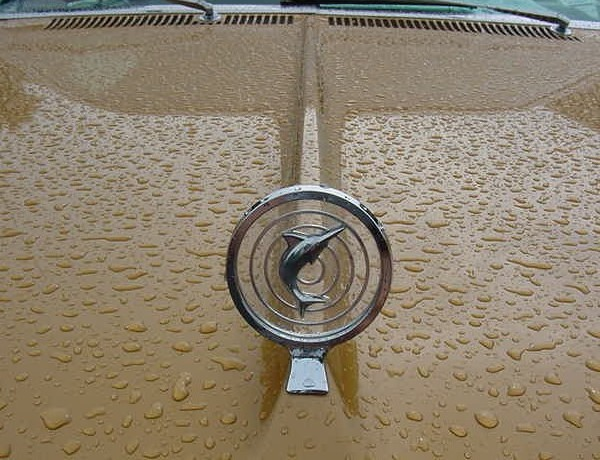
1967 AMC Marlin

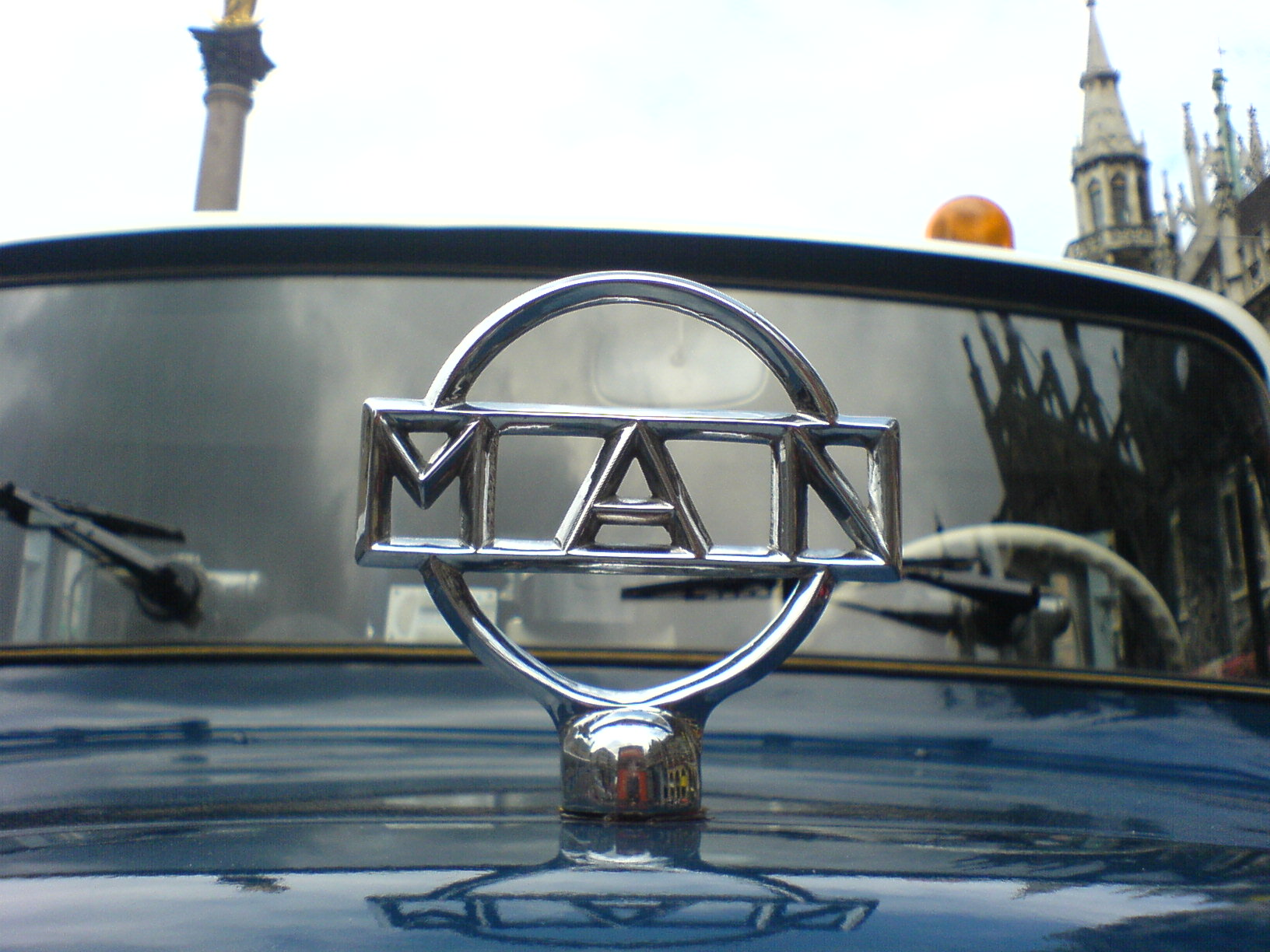
1970s MAN truck

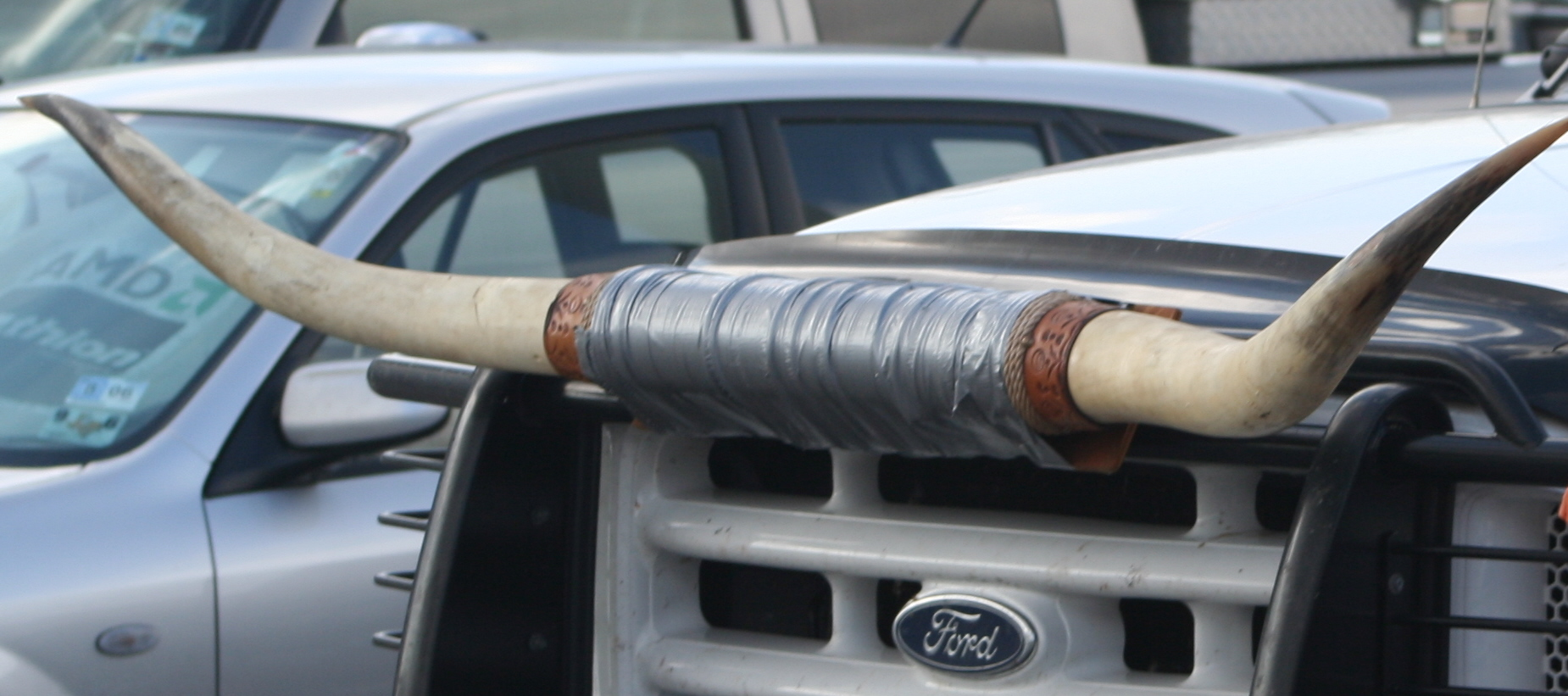
Home-made hood ornament on pick-up truck in Texas

A hood ornament (or bonnet ornament or bonnet mascot in Commonwealth English), also called a motor mascot or car mascot, is a specially crafted model that symbolizes a car company, like a badge, located on the front center portion of the hood. It has been used as an adornment nearly since the inception of automobiles.

== Origin ==
According to the author of A History of Cars written for youth, the first "hood ornament" was a sun-crested falcon (to bring good luck) mounted on the Egyptian pharaoh Tutankhamun's chariot.

In the early years, automobiles had their radiator caps outside the hood and on top of the grille, which also served as an indicator of the temperature of the engine's coolant fluid. The Boyce MotoMeter Company was issued a patent in 1912 for a radiator cap that incorporated a thermometer that was visible to the driver with a sensor that measured the heat of the water vapor, rather than the water itself. This became useful gauge for the driver because many early engines did not have water pumps, but a circulation system based on the "thermo-syphon" principle as in the Ford Model T.

The "exposed radiator cap became a focal point for automobile personalization."

Hood ornaments were popular in the 1920s, 1930s, 1940s, and 1950s, with many automakers fitting them to their vehicles. They also serve to differentiate cars and the ornaments were inspired by animals, mythological figures, and the automakers' logos. A common element on every Rolls-Royce since 1911 is the "Spirit of Ecstasy" on the hood that serves as a type of "calling card" and denotes the message of luxury. During the 1920s, advertisements for Mercedes-Benz emphasized their "star" hood ornament as representing the "world-famous product of the oldest automobile works in the world" and as the ultimate symbol of luxury.

A market developed supplying accessories to those who wanted to add an ornament or car mascot to their automobile. These were a way to express the owner's love of their car or customizing to express individuality. Most of these companies went out of business, with only Louis Lejeune Ltd. in England surviving. Sculptors like Bazin, Paillet, Sykes, Renevey, and Lejeune created detailed miniature sculptures, like figurines.

Hood ornaments were viewed as "objets d'art" according to Richard Teague, who served as styling vice president at American Motors Corporation (AMC). A sculptor described some hood ornaments as “certainly some kind of sex symbol—a symbol of virility." There were Art Deco stylized women’s forms serving as hood ornaments. After World War II, Nash Motors commissioned George Petty to design hood ornaments featuring female figures without clothing for their cars. Petty used his daughter to make the "Flying Lady" hood ornament which became a marketing coup for Nash and the 1950 "Airflyte" models in the Ambassador and Statesman cars. Nash had four different versions of this iconic ornament on its vehicles for ten years before designing non-anthropomorphic hood decorations.

Teague brought back a hood ornament for the top-of-the-line AMC Ambassador cars because of the "good feeling" they provide to the owners "or at least a reminder of the money spent on the car." Others in the auto industry, such as Dick Macadam, a chief stylist at Chrysler hold the view that hood ornaments provide an aiming point for centering, "possibly making for easier and safer car handling."

== Legal restrictions ==
Restrictions to fitting ornaments on the front of vehicles have been introduced in some jurisdictions. Projecting decorative designs on the hood may increase the risk of injury to pedestrians during a collision.

Regulations introduced in the United States for the 1968 model year vehicles meant the disappearance of fixed stand-up hood ornaments, as well as spinner wheel protrusions. Later versions featured flexibly mounted (spring-loaded) stand-up hood ornaments designed to fold without breaking on impact, such as on the 1973 Ford Thunderbird, 1974 AMC Ambassador, and on the 1986 Jeep Wagoneer (SJ).

In the European Union, since 1974, all new cars have had to conform to a European directive on vehicle exterior projections. Rolls-Royce's mascot is now mounted on a spring-loaded mechanism designed to retract instantly into the radiator shell if struck with a force greater than 98 newtons (22 pounds-force). This same mechanism also lowers the ornament out of view when the car is turned off, protecting it from damage or theft while the car is parked up. Other hood ornaments were designed with a spring mount to fold on impact. For aftermarket ornaments, breakaway nylon fixings are available that comply with EC Directive 74/483.

The ornaments have been moved down from the hood to the grille. They are now viewed as overwrought and detrimental to aerodynamics.

== Branding ==
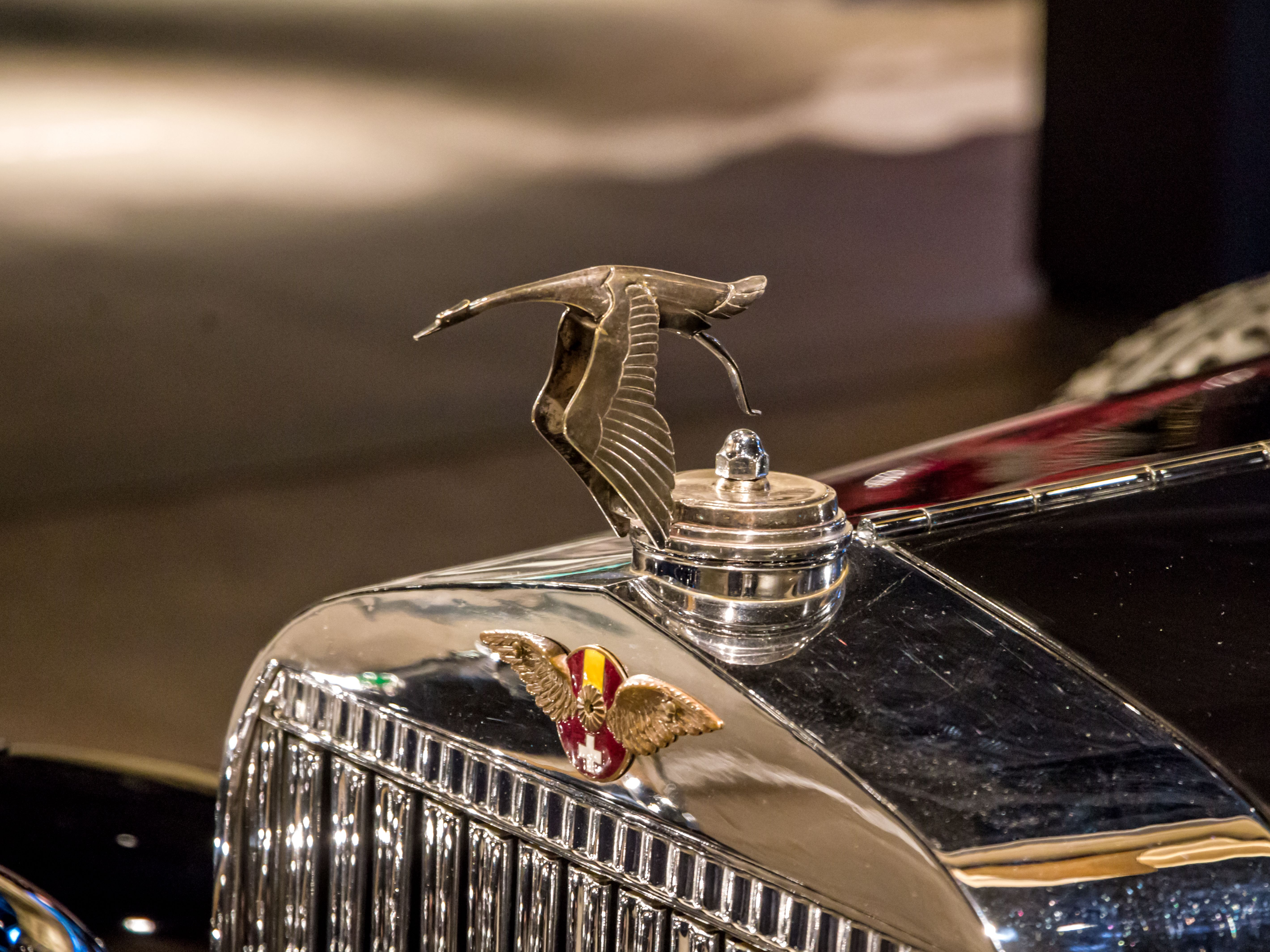
Hispano-Suiza K6 Berline Vanvooren

Many automakers wanted their emblems displayed on their vehicles' hoods. Boyce Motormeter accommodated them with corporate logos or mascots, as well as numerous organizations that wanted custom cap emblems to identify their members. The company had over 300 such customers at one time during the mid-1920s, for car, truck, tractor, boat, airplane, and motorcycle manufacturers, and in 1927, had 1,800 employees in six countries: U.S., England, Canada, Australia, France, and Germany. The hundreds of motor vehicle manufacturers before 1929 meant many customers for their customized emblems.

Brand identification remains essential "as firms try to distinguish their company's cookie-cutter SUV, sedan or pick-up truck from another company's cookie-cutter SUV, sedan, or pick-up truck merely with a hood ornament or a name on the bumper."

=== Examples ===
Along with the grille, the hood ornament is often a distinctive styling element, and many marques use it as their primary brand identifier.

Examples of hood ornaments include:

- Archer on Pierce-Arrow cars
- Ottawa leader Pontiac on Pontiac automobiles
- Crest and wreath on Cadillac cars
- Letter "B" with wings on Bentley cars
- Ball with wings on Horch cars
- Leaping jaguar on Jaguar cars
- Lion rampant on Peugeot cars
- Marlin jumping out of water mounted in a "sight" on AMC's fastback
- Rocket on Oldsmobile cars
- Rocky Mountain big horn ram's head on Dodge cars and trucks
- Spirit of Ecstasy on Rolls-Royce cars
- Stork on Hispano-Suiza cars
- Three-pointed star surrounded by a circle on Mercedes-Benz sedans and wagons
- Trishields on Buick cars

Additionally, many models in all price and market segments, such as Buick Regal, Chevrolet Impala, Jeep Grand Wagoneer (SJ), and Chrysler Cordoba, featured unique emblems and accompanying distinctive standup hood ornaments.

=== The importance of design ===
While "originally designed for a purpose," the hood ornament became "transformed into elaborate decorations or symbols." As a result, the radiator cap was changed into an art form and became a way of individualizing the car, "representing a company's vision of the automobile", or "speaking volumes about the owner" of the vehicle. Another design objective developed for the hood ornament "reflected an idea of motion and speed and grace."

There are legal issues in protecting the designs of hood ornaments. Less expensive than patenting the design, protection by copyright may be possible "only if, and only to the extent that, such design incorporates pictorial, graphic, or sculptural features that can be identified separately from, and capable of existing independently of, the utilitarian aspects of the article." Thus, the Rolls Royce ornament could be used as a separate sculpture while most other distinctive hood ornament forms would not be considered free-standing items.

== Materials used in manufacturing ==
Hood ornaments are usually cast in brass, zinc, or bronze and chrome plated. During the years when chrome plating was unavailable, silver or nickel was substituted. Some also incorporated other materials, like plastic, bakelite, or colored glass. The 1950 Ford Custom DeLuxe hood ornament was molded in Plexiglas. Others contained a light bulb for illumination at night. Pontiac featured a lighted Indian-head hood ornament through 1955, after which it was replaced by the flying V design.

The best-known glass mascots were made by René Lalique in France. Other sellers or producers of glass mascots include Sabino in France, Red Ashay in England, and Persons Majestic in the U.S. The latter two had their products made in Czechoslovakia. Like Louis Lejeune Ltd., the Lalique Company is one of the few survivors from this era of motoring.

== Collectability ==
Some hood ornaments are attractive for more than the car's owners such as the red-white-and-blue golden lion crests that were on the hoods of 1950 Fords that children took to decorate their hats, belts, or bicycles. The company solved the problem by offering a free miniature crest to all the kids that wrote letters requesting one.

There is also a collector's market for hood ornaments and car mascots.

== See also ==
- Figurehead
