= Louis Lejeune Ltd. =

Louis Lejeune Ltd. is a small bronze foundry in England, producing mainly car mascots (hood ornaments). It is the only surviving maker of custom car mascots from the art deco era of the 1920s and 1930s when many new cars were fitted with a mascot.

== History ==
The company was founded in London in 1910 as AE Lejeune (AEL), by a French silversmith Emil Lejeune and his wife Augustine (known as "Mimi"), who had arrived in England from Paris in 1904. The company initially made small ornamental bronze sculptures and architectural fittings. It later found a market for car mascots, the first of these was probably the "Speed Nymph", the design for which was registered in 1917. Lejeune went on to commission mascots from sculptors such as Frederic Bazin and Charles Paillet. In 1926, they moved premises from Hallam Street to Great Portland Street. By 1929, AEL was being described as "the world's largest motor car mascot manufacturer". They were commissioned by leading British motor manufacturers to produce their official mascots; these included the Star, Crossley, Alvis, Rolls-Royce and Bentley.

Upon Lejeune's death in 1933, his 25-year-old son, his son took over and renamed the company, although "Mimi" was appointed chairman and managing director. In 1940, Louis Lejeune was in France during the Battle of France and did not return to England until 1945, when he replaced his mother as managing director. Louis Lejeune died in 1978, and the company passed to his English widow, Eloise. In 1978 the business was bought by the export executive and amateur sculptor Sir David Hughes. The Great Portland Street office and workshop had been reduced to a state of "Dickensian decrepitude" and Hughes moved the operation to Wilburton in Cambridgeshire where he set up a small investment casting foundry and workshop. Hughes's son Timothy has been running the company since 1998. Hughes died in May 2003.
