= Boyce MotoMeter =

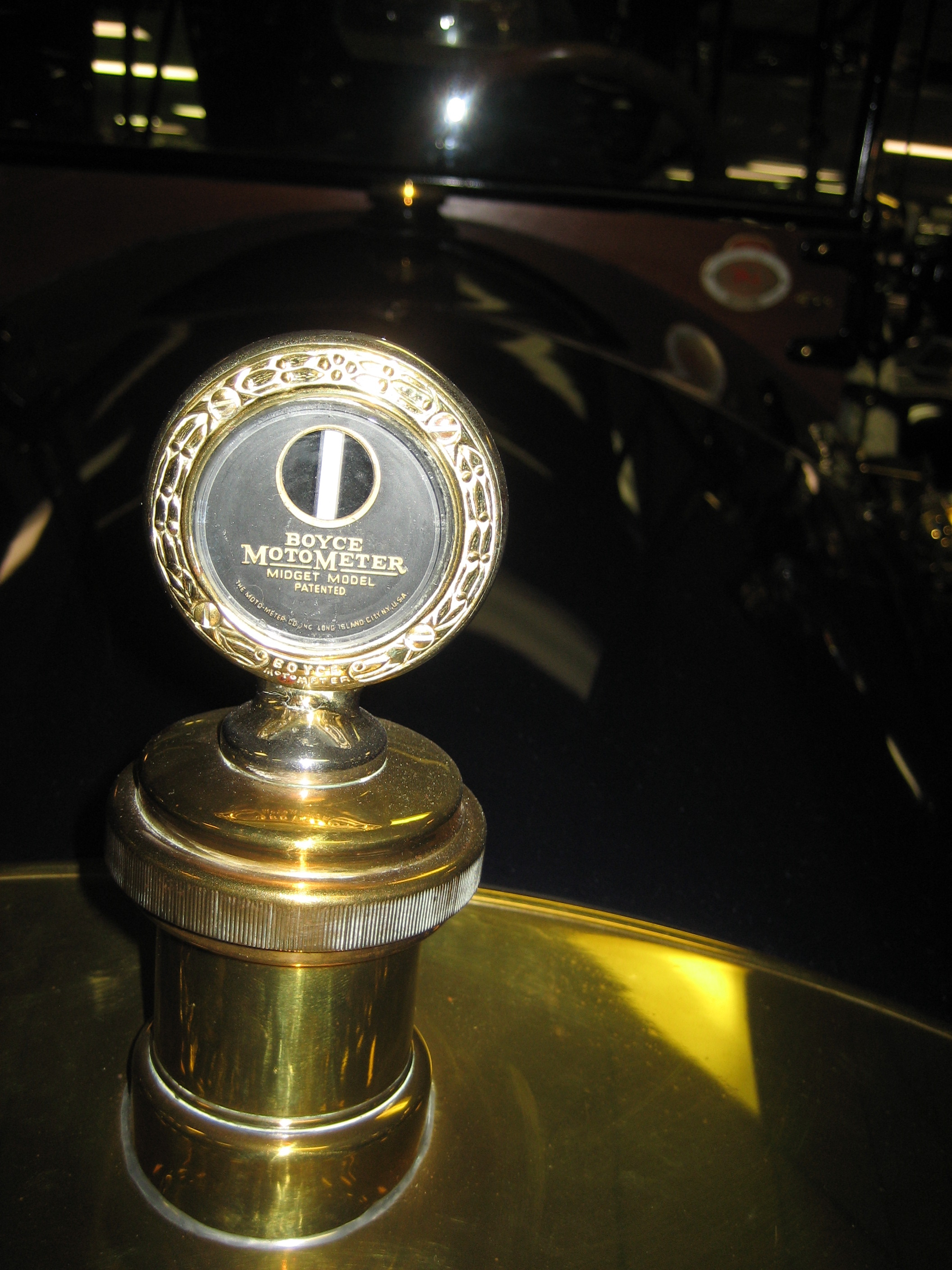
A standard Boyce MotoMeter on a 1913 Car-Nation.

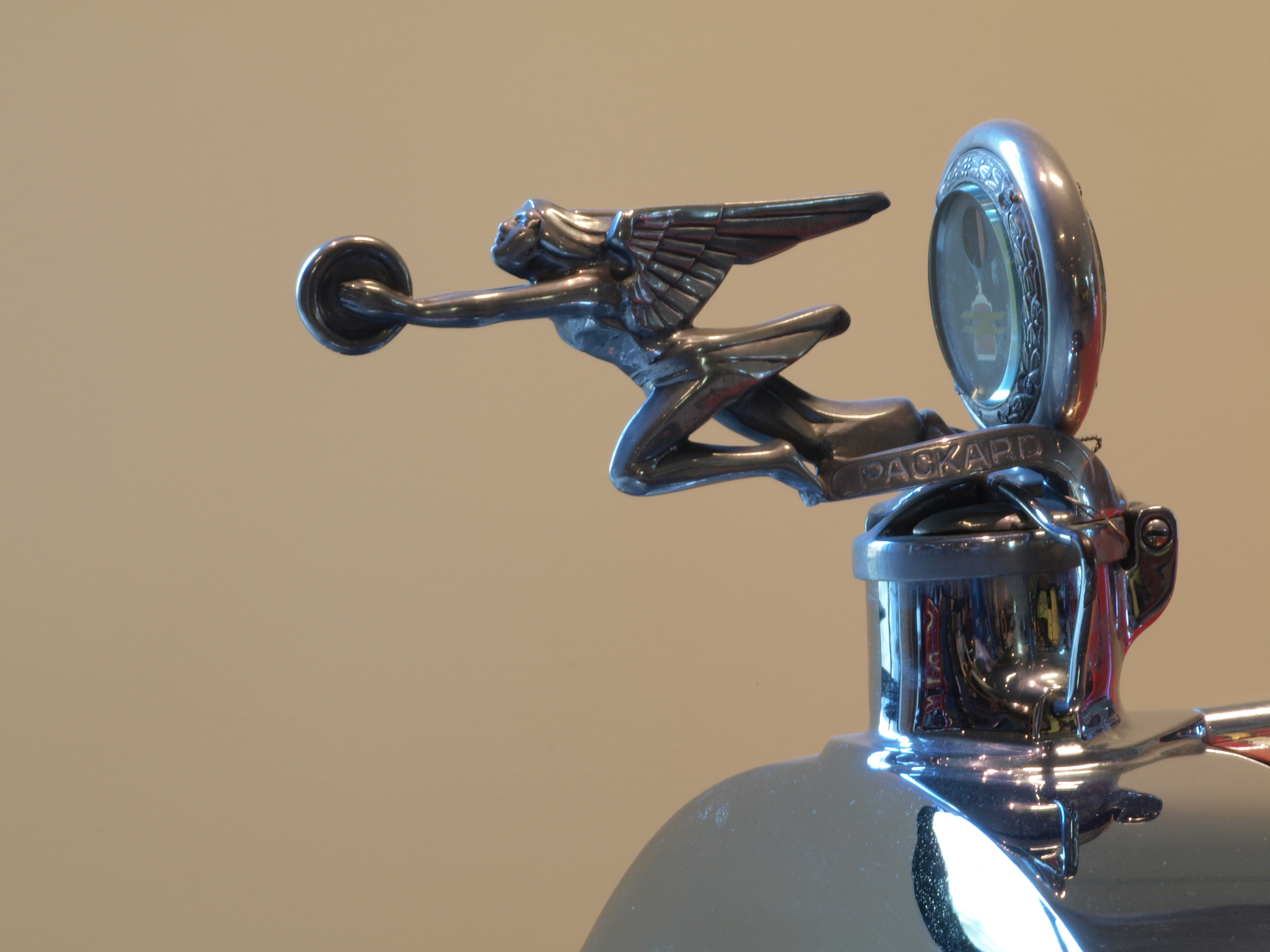
A standard Boyce MotoMeter fitted together with hood mascot. 1926 Packard Six model 226.

The Boyce MotoMeter was patented in 1912, and was used in automobiles to show the temperature of the radiator. From then through the late 1920s, the Boyce MotoMeter Company in Long Island City, New York, founded in 1912 by the German immigrant Hermann Schlaich, manufactured different models which varied in size and design.

The non-pressurized Thermosiphon cooling systems that were widely used until the 1920s led to a low boiling point. The Boyce MotoMeter was a simple and innovative device. For the first time, drivers had information about the engine temperature while operating the car. Sometimes, however, it failed to warn drivers about engine overheating in time to prevent damage.

Motometers were at first aftermarket devices. Later, vehicle builders (not only car manufacturers) began to offer them as standard or optional equipment, and dealerships began to offer them also, sometimes as give-away or incentive items. The MotoMeter Company soon delivered these with metal dials inside that showed the maker's or dealer's logo with script printed on it. The standard motometer came in three sizes: for small cars, medium cars, and large cars and trucks. There were also slight changes to each of the original models and new designs, and accessories such as hood ornaments, toppers, illuminating devices or locks were added to the line of meters while some others were discontinued. Toppers were small metal castings that fitted to a bracket on the motometer. They were used in a similar way as modern decals showing the vehicle owner's heritage, profession, preferences, his business, his preferred sports, or even a political statement. Toppers were also offered by other novelty producing companies, Ronson among them. Boyce kept several patents on its products and fought infringements.

By 1927 the company was offering a wide variety of motometer, but the device became obsolete when dash-mounted temperature gauges appeared around 1930. Boyce had had such a device patented as early as 1917.

== Other manufacturers of motometers ==
There were many manufacturers of engine thermometers: they used different, and sometimes complicated, designs to get a reliable and accurate gauge.

- American Motor Safety Corp., Kalamazoo, Michigan; "Unbreakable Hydrometer
- Great Northern Sales Co., "Bemometer"
- G. H. Morden Co., London, "The Morden Indicator"
- Auto Radiator Meter Co., Seattle, Washington; Metro Scope - Benson Favorite
- Bushnell Manufacturing Co., Berkeley, California; Arrometer and Junior Arrometer
- W.B. Jarvis Co., Grand Rapids, Michigan
- Radiametre Maxant, Paris
- Wilmot-Breeden, Ltd., United Kingdom
