= Côte d'Azur Pullman Express =

French de luxe train

The Côte d'Azur Pullman Express was a French de luxe train which ran from 9 December 1929 until May 1939. The service was operated by the Compagnie Internationale des Wagons-Lits and the Compagnie des Chemins de Fer de Paris à Lyon et à la Méditerranée (known as the PLM).

The route was from Paris Gare de Lyon to Ventimiglia just inside the Italian border. During the winter of 1932 the train terminated at Menton, on the French side of the border. The following winter it terminated at Lyon.

The train was scheduled to leave Paris at 08:50, arriving at Ventimiglia at midnight, some 15 hours 10 minutes later.
