= René Lalique =

French jeweller and glass designer (1860-1945)

- Born: René Jules Lalique; 6 April 1860; Aÿ, Marne, France
- Died: 1 May 1945 (aged 85); Paris, France
- Education: Collège Turgot, Ecole des arts décoratifs, Crystal Palace School of Art
- Occupation: Glass designer
- Known for: Glass art
- Spouses: Marie-Louise Lambert; Alice Ledru
- Children: 6

René Jules Lalique (French pronunciation: [ʁəne ʒyl lalik]; 6 April 1860 – 1 May 1945) was a French jeweller, medallist, and glass designer known for his creations of glass art, perfume bottles, vases, jewellery, chandeliers, clocks, and automobile hood ornaments.

== Early life and education ==
Lalique was born 6 April 1860 in Aÿ, Marne, France, one of two children, to Auguste Jules Lalique (1831–1875), a traveling peddler, and Olympe Lalique (née Berthellemy; 1835–1906).

The family moved to the suburbs of Paris in 1962, but traveled to Aÿ for summer holidays. These trips later influenced Lalique's naturalistic glasswork.

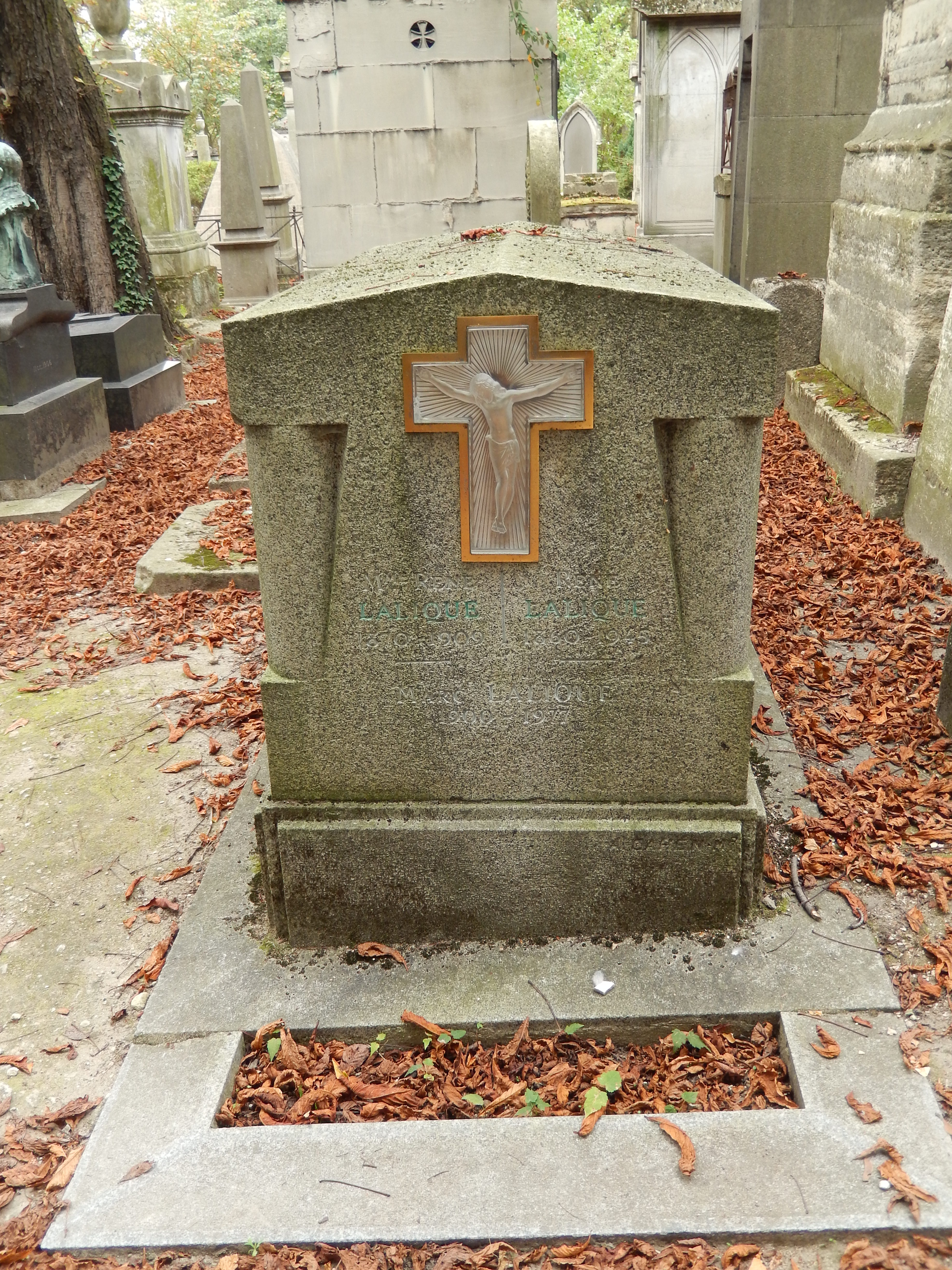
Tomb of Lalique (and of his wife Alice and son Marc) in the Père Lachaise Cemetery, Paris

At the age of twelve, Lalique entered the Collège Turgot, where he started drawing and sketching. He attended evening classes at the École des arts décoratifs. He worked there from 1874 to 1876 and subsequently spent two years at the Crystal Palace School of Art Sydenham, London. At Sydenham, he improved his graphic design skills and further developed his naturalistic approach to art.

At age 16, following the death of his father, Lalique apprenticed with the Art Nouveau jewelry designer and goldsmith Louis Aucoc, one of the leading jewelers working in Paris at the time, to learn commercial jewelry production and design.

== Professional career ==
By 1881, Lalique worked as a freelance designer for several French jewelry firms, including Cartier and Boucheron. In 1886, he founded his first atelier in Paris in the former workshop of jeweler Jules Destape. In 1890, Lalique opened a jewelry store in the Opéra district of Paris. Here Lalique created some of his most famous jewelry designs and experimented with glasswork.

The natural world was a primary theme of Lalique's work, often featuring motifs such as dragonflies, orchids, and peacocks. His pieces combined traditional jewelry materials, such as precious metals and gemstones, with less commonly used semi-precious media such as enamel, glass, and horn. Lalique surrounded himself at work with flowers to serve as inspiration for his art. These motifs symbolized the organic flow of life, metamorphosis, and beauty in motion. He also incorporated Japanese nature motifs into his art.

== Art Nouveau jewelry designer ==
Aside from the jewelry he produced for his own shop, Lalique created pieces for Samuel Bing's Paris gallery, the Maison de l'Art Nouveau, from which the Art Nouveau movement derived its name. One of Lalique's major patrons was Calouste Sarkis Gulbenkian, who commissioned more than 140 of his works over nearly 30 years. Many of these works can be seen on permanent display at the Calouste Gulbenkian Museum in Lisbon, Portugal.

Representative of the Art Nouveau style, many of his jewelry pieces and vases showcase plants, flowers, and flowing lines.

== Glass maker ==
Lalique was best known for his creations in glass art. In the 1920s, he became noted for his work in the Art Deco style. He was responsible for the walls of lighted glass and elegant coloured glass columns that filled the dining room and "grand salon" of the SS Normandie and the interior fittings, cross, screens, reredos, and font of St. Matthew's Church at Millbrook in Jersey, also known as Lalique's "Glass Church".

In 1907, Lalique began collaborating with François Coty to design luxury perfume bottles.

Lalique was a pioneer in the use of pâte-de-verre, an ancient glassworking technique, in Art Nouveau. He used this method to mold ground glass into intricate, lifelike forms in jewelry and decorative objects.

Lalique's pieces appear in the collections of public museums around the world, including the Museu Calouste Gulbenkian in Lisbon, the Lalique Museum of Hakone in Japan, the Musée Lalique and the Musée des Arts Décoratifs in France, the Schmuckmuseum Pforzheim in Germany, the Victoria and Albert Museum in London, the Metropolitan Museum and the Corning Museum in New York State, and the Rijksmuseum in Amsterdam.

== Personal life ==
Lalique died in Paris on 1 May or 5 May 1945 and was buried in Père Lachaise Cemetery. His daughter, Suzanne Lalique, was the painter and set designer for the Comédie-Française. His son Marc Lalique (1900 - 1977) continued the family business as a glass artist. Under Marc's direction, Maison Lalique transitioned from glass to crystal in the early 1950s. Marc's daughter, Marie Claude-Lalique (b. 1936), was also a glass maker; she died on 14 April 2003 in Fort Myers, Florida.

== Works ==
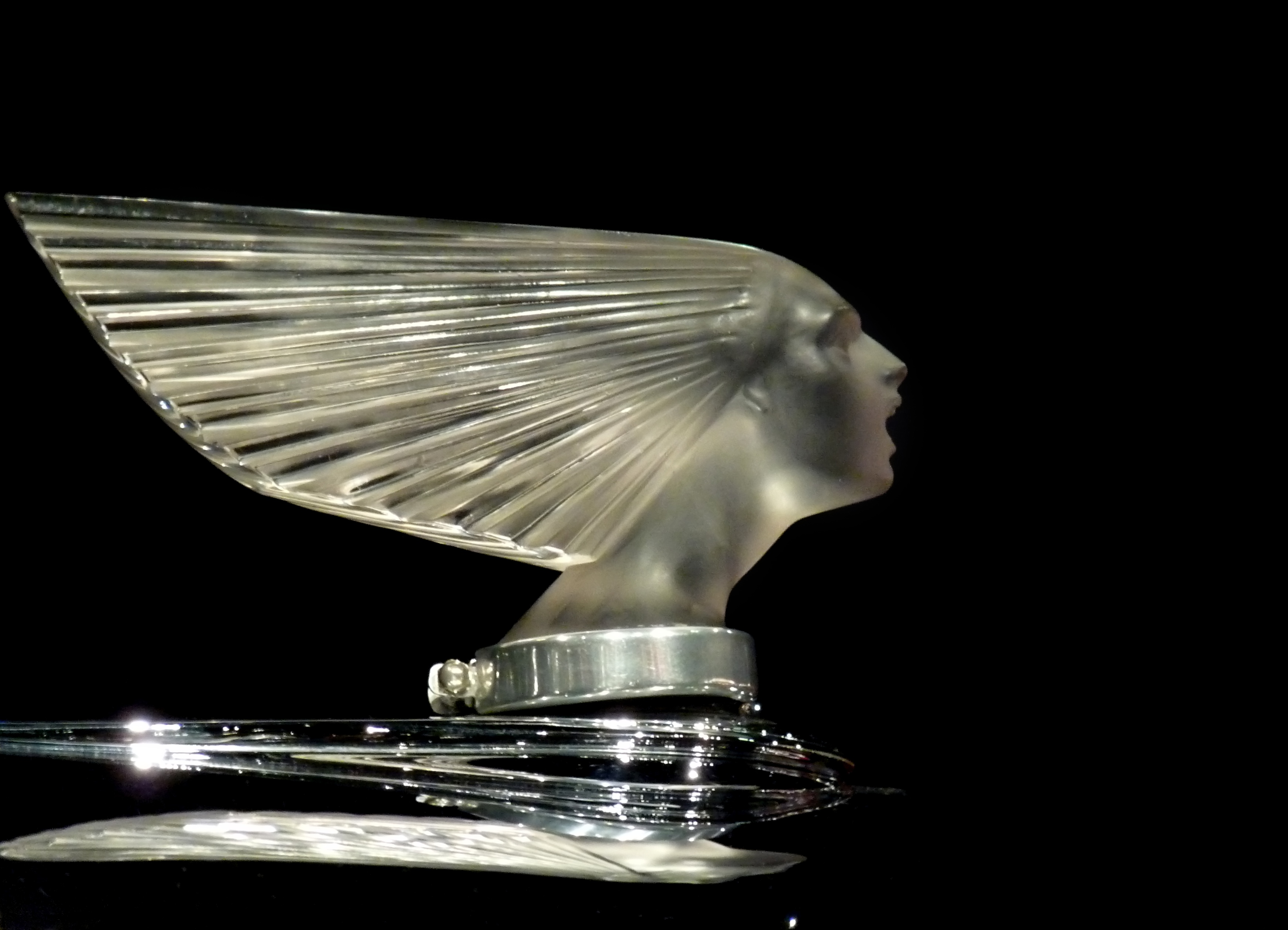
Citroën Company Spirit of the Wind, Blackhawk Museum

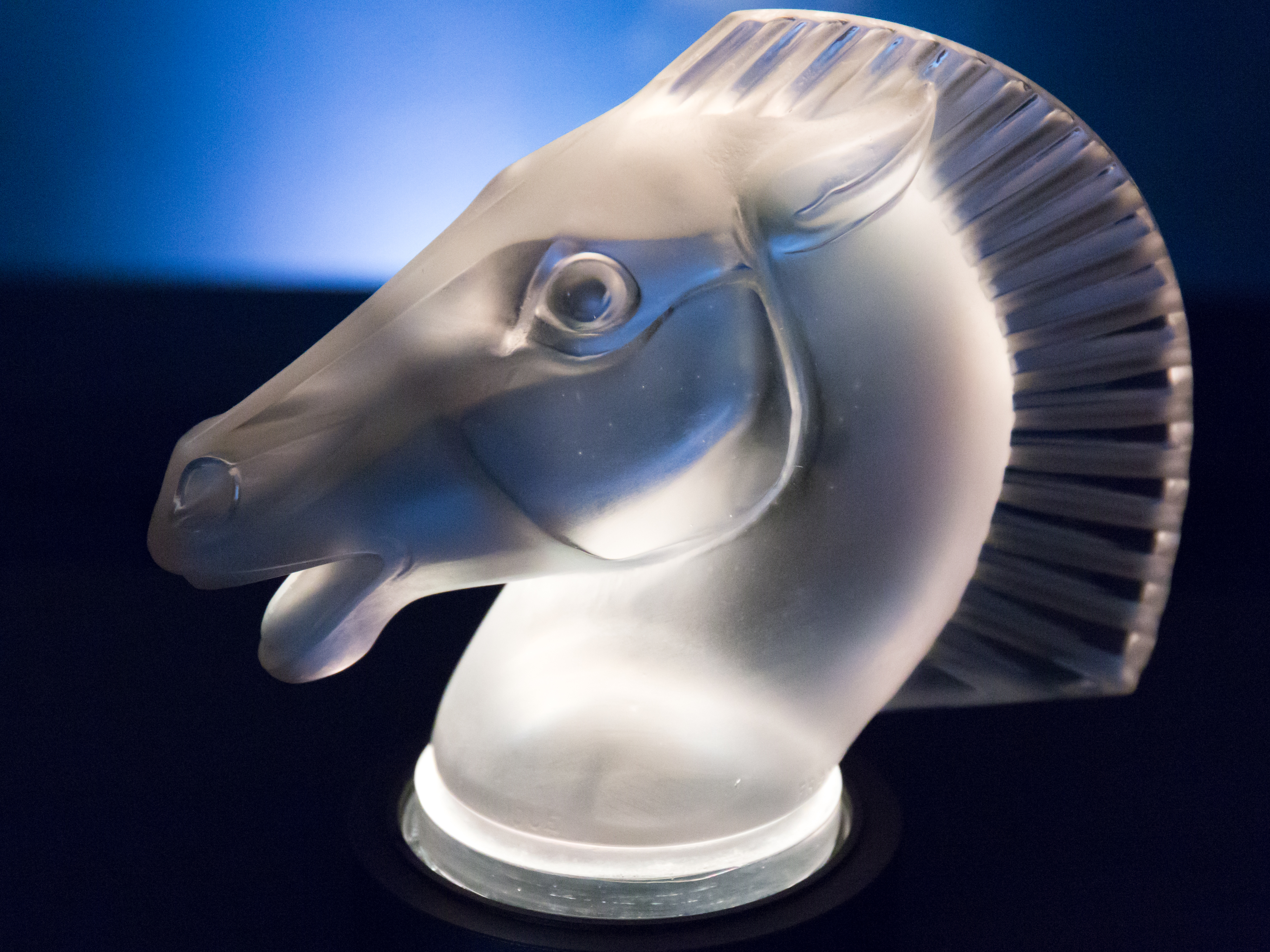
Toyota: Horse

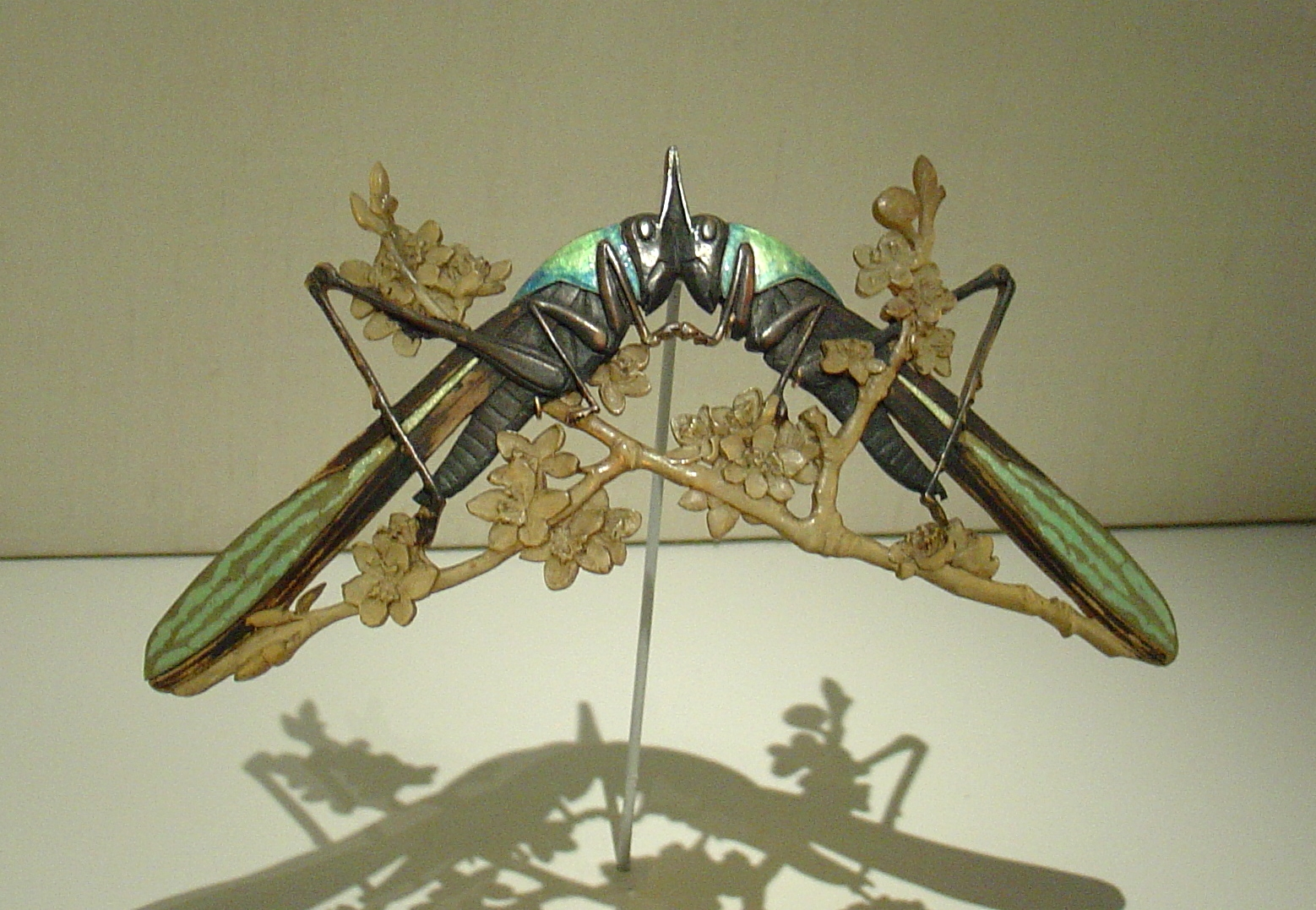
Cicadas, Museu Calouste Gulbenkian

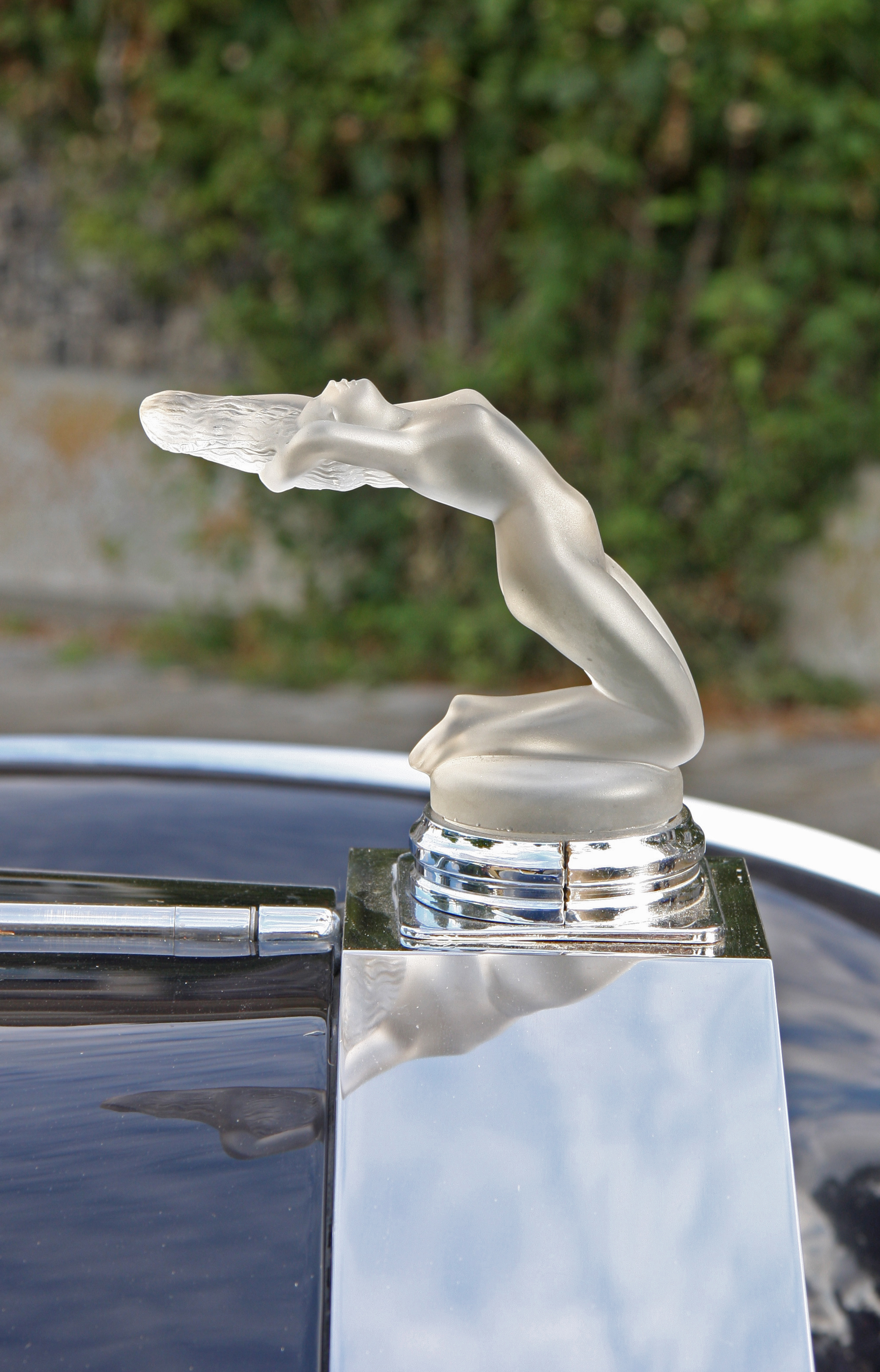
1956 Rolls-Royce Silver Wraith, glass model

Tiara, Museu Calouste Gulbenkian

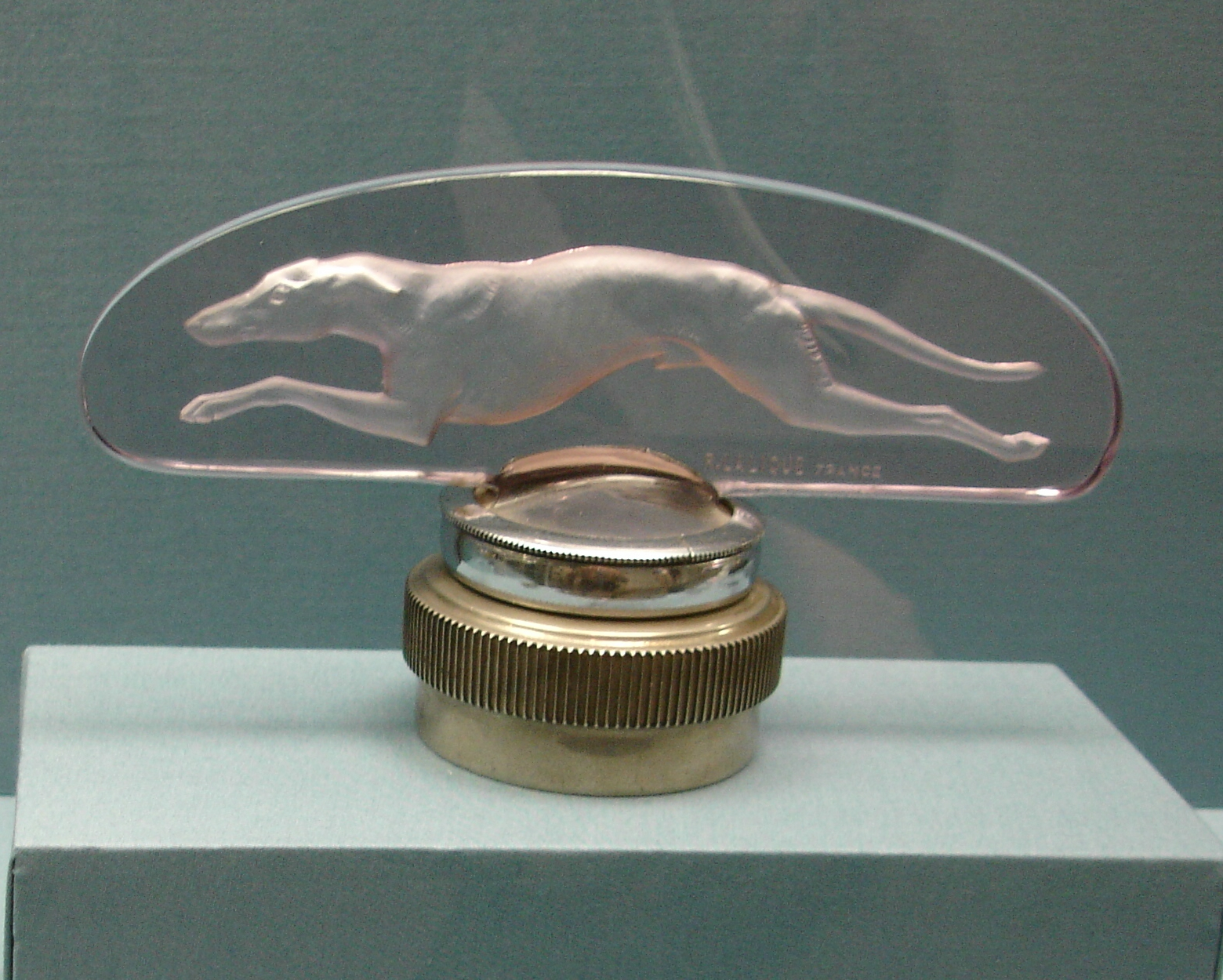
Lalique Hood ornament

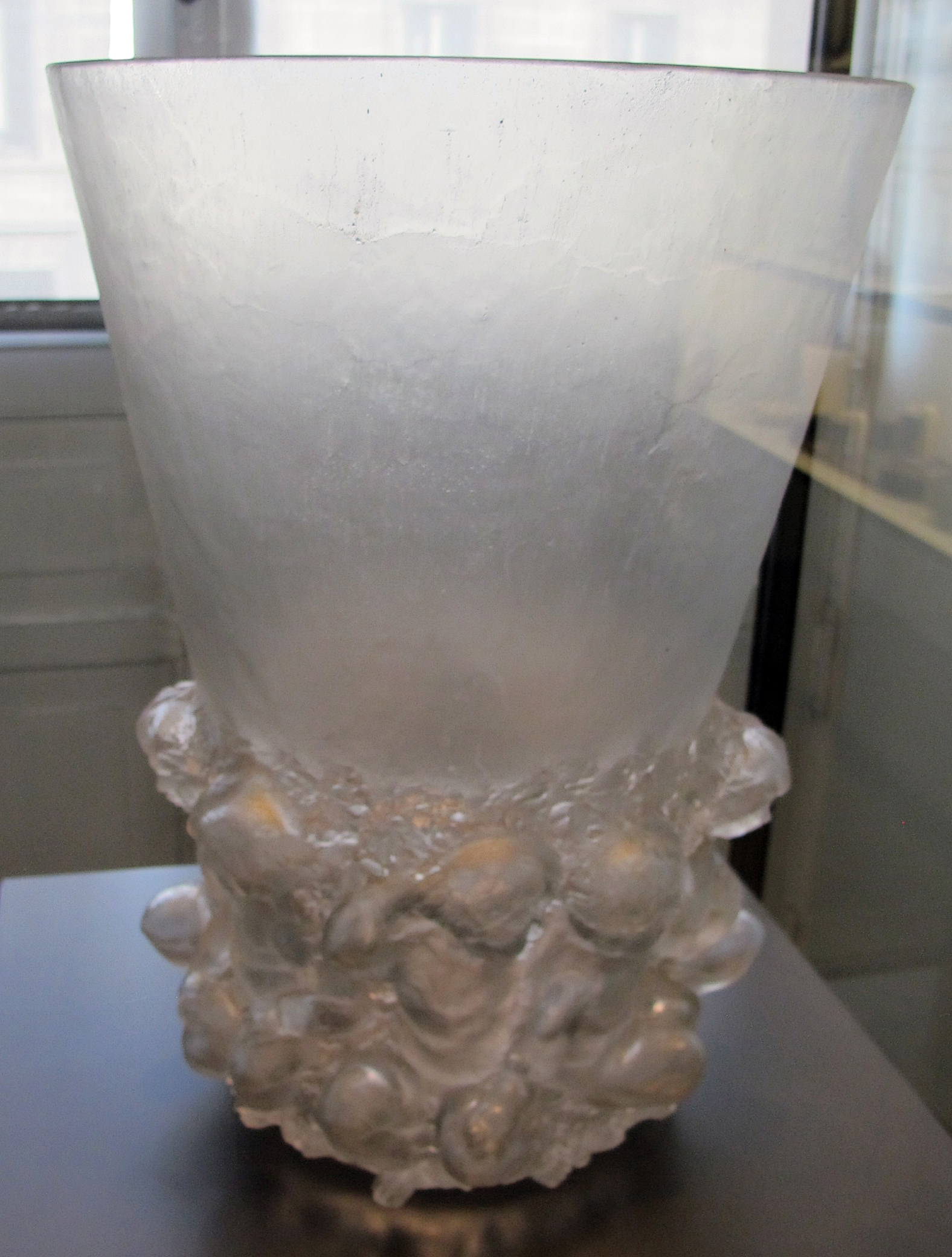
Glass vase

Fern Leaves Brooch, Walters Art Museum, Baltimore

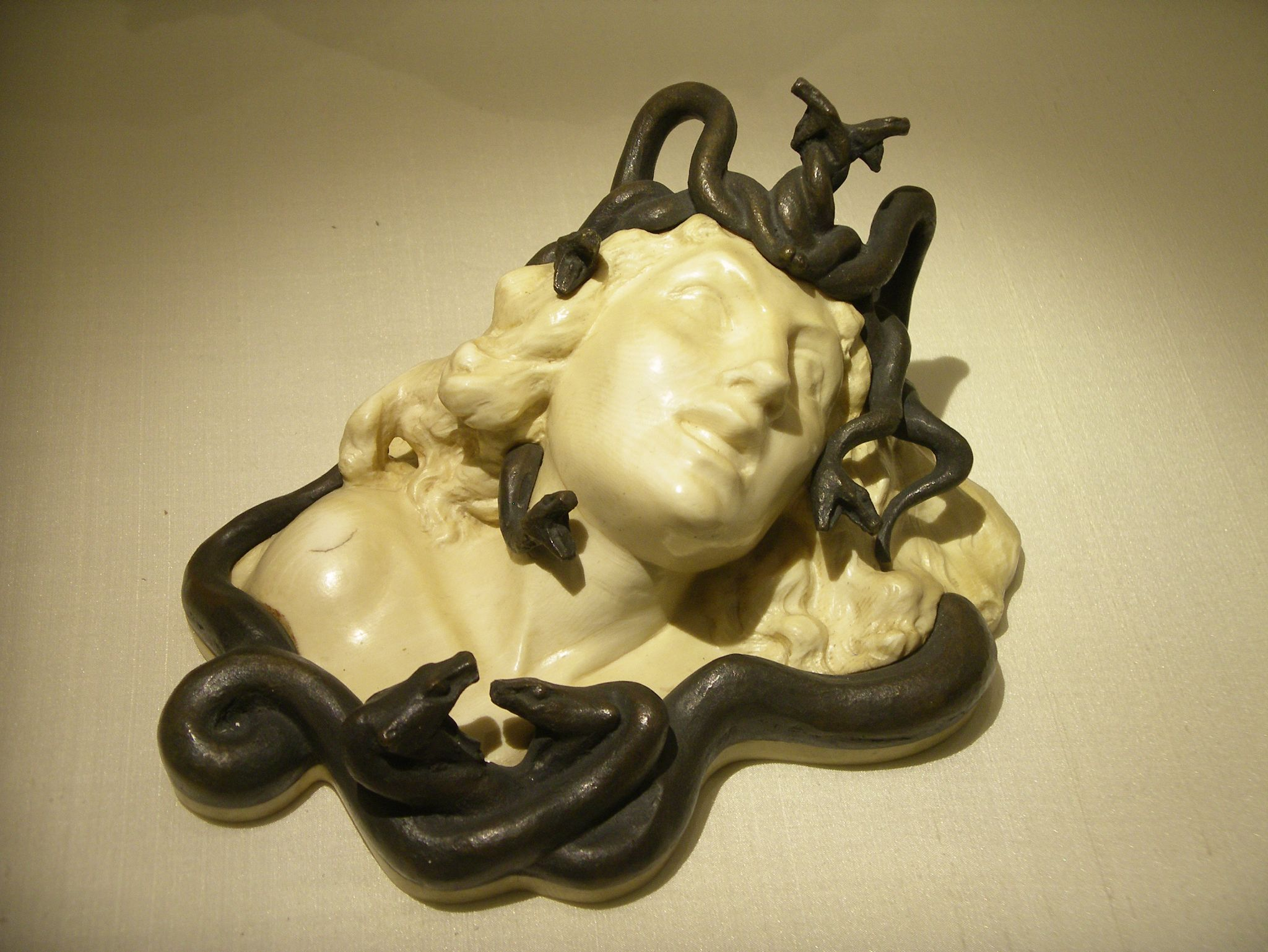
Medusa

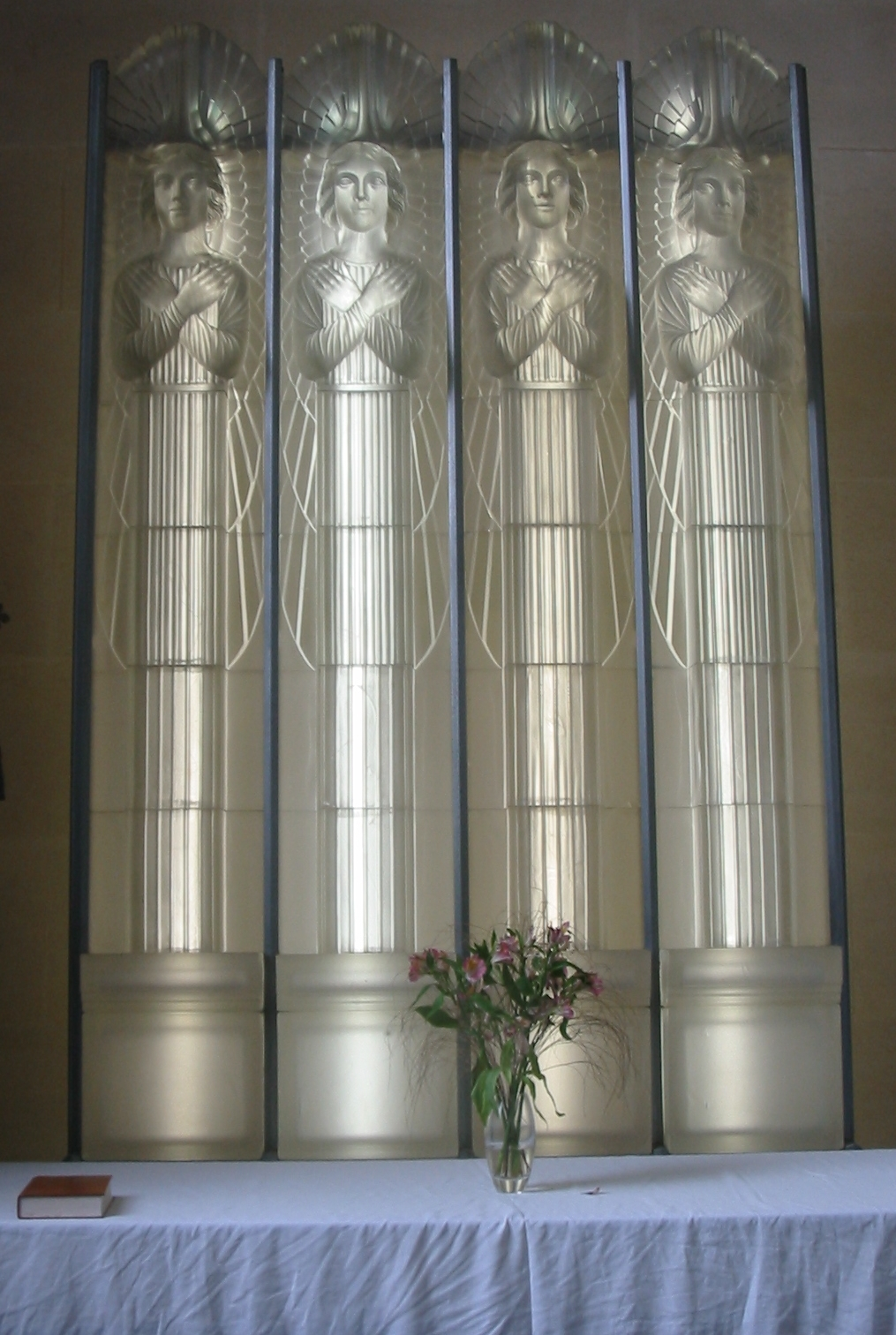
Lalique glass altarpiece in St. Matthew's Church (the Glass Church), Millbrook, Jersey

Dragonfly lady brooch, Museu Calouste Gulbenkian, acquired from the artist in 1903

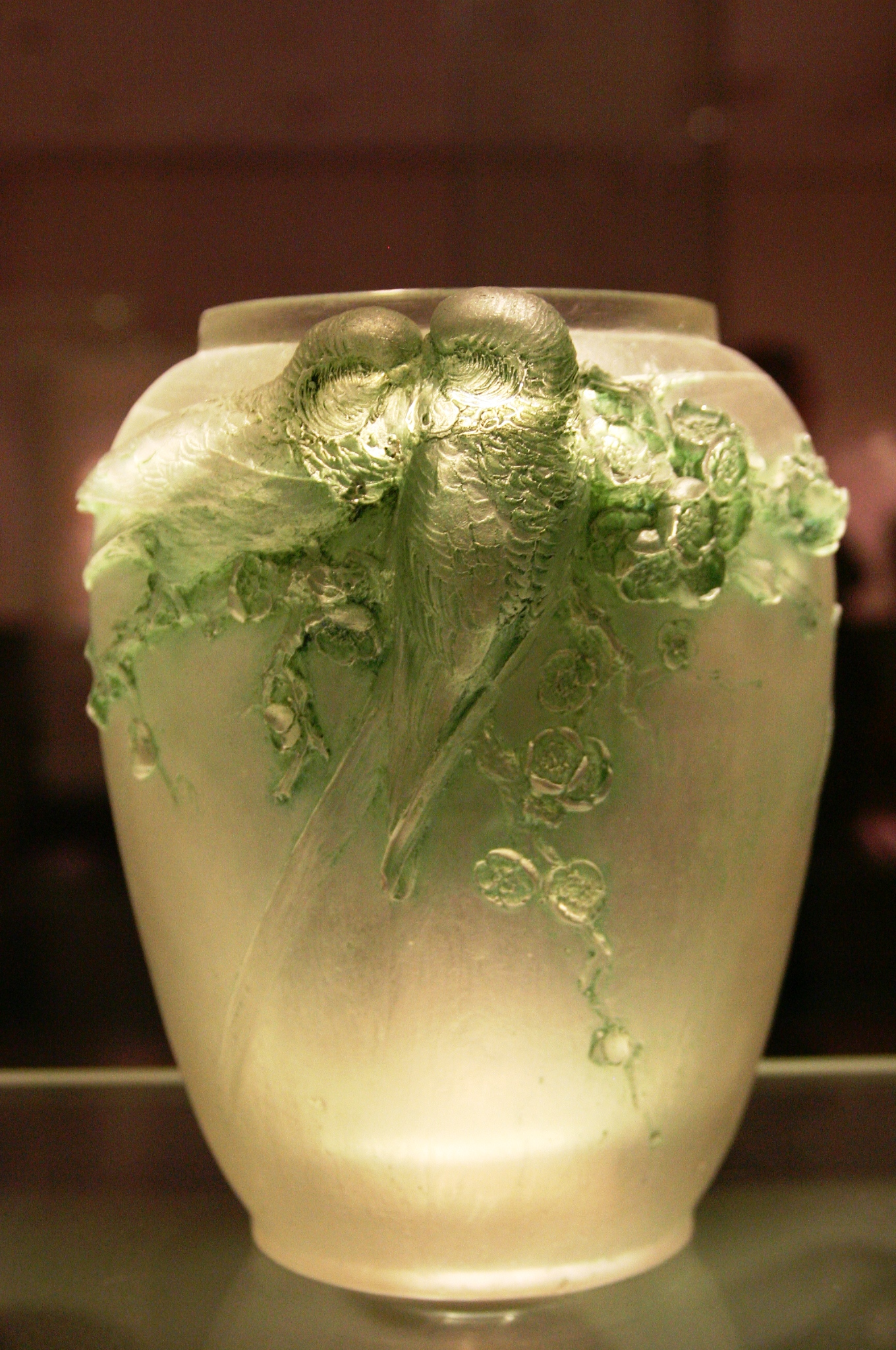
Glass vase, Museu Calouste Gulbenkian

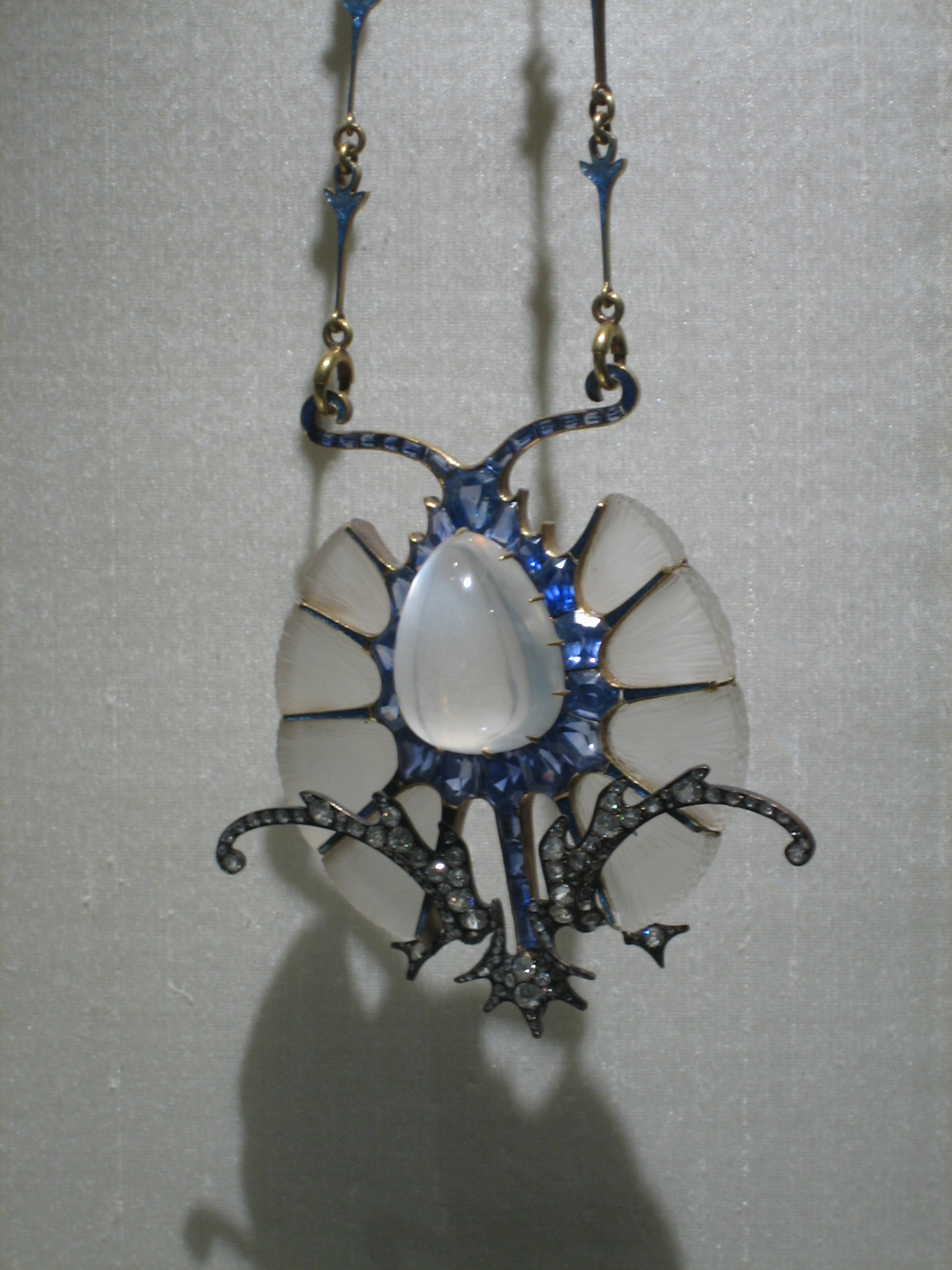
Pendant, Museu Calouste Gulbenkian

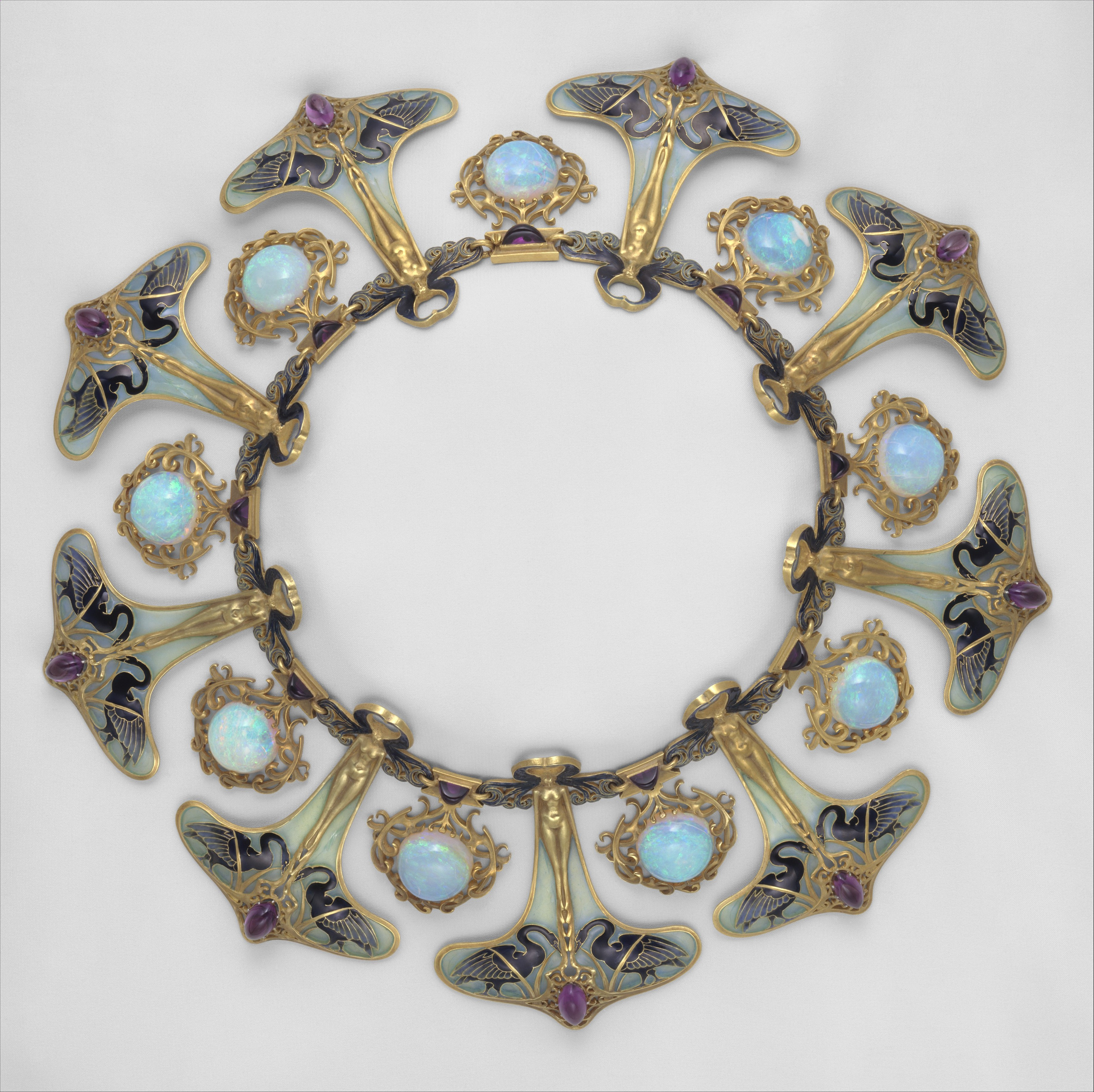
Necklace designed for Lalique's second wife, Alice Ledru, ca 1897–99, Metropolitan Museum of Art, New York

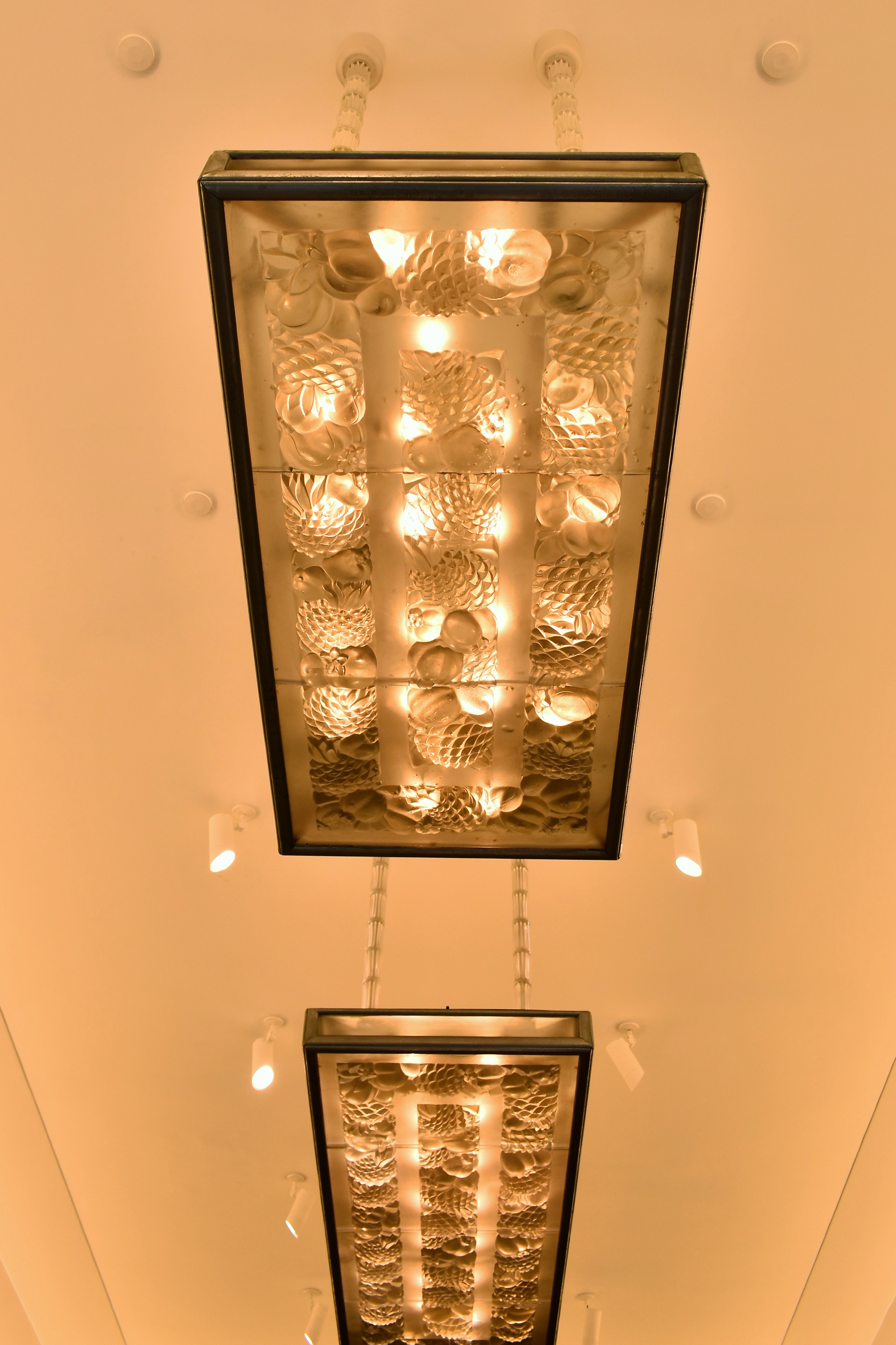
A lighting fixture in the great dining room in the Tokyo Metropolitan Teien Art Museum.

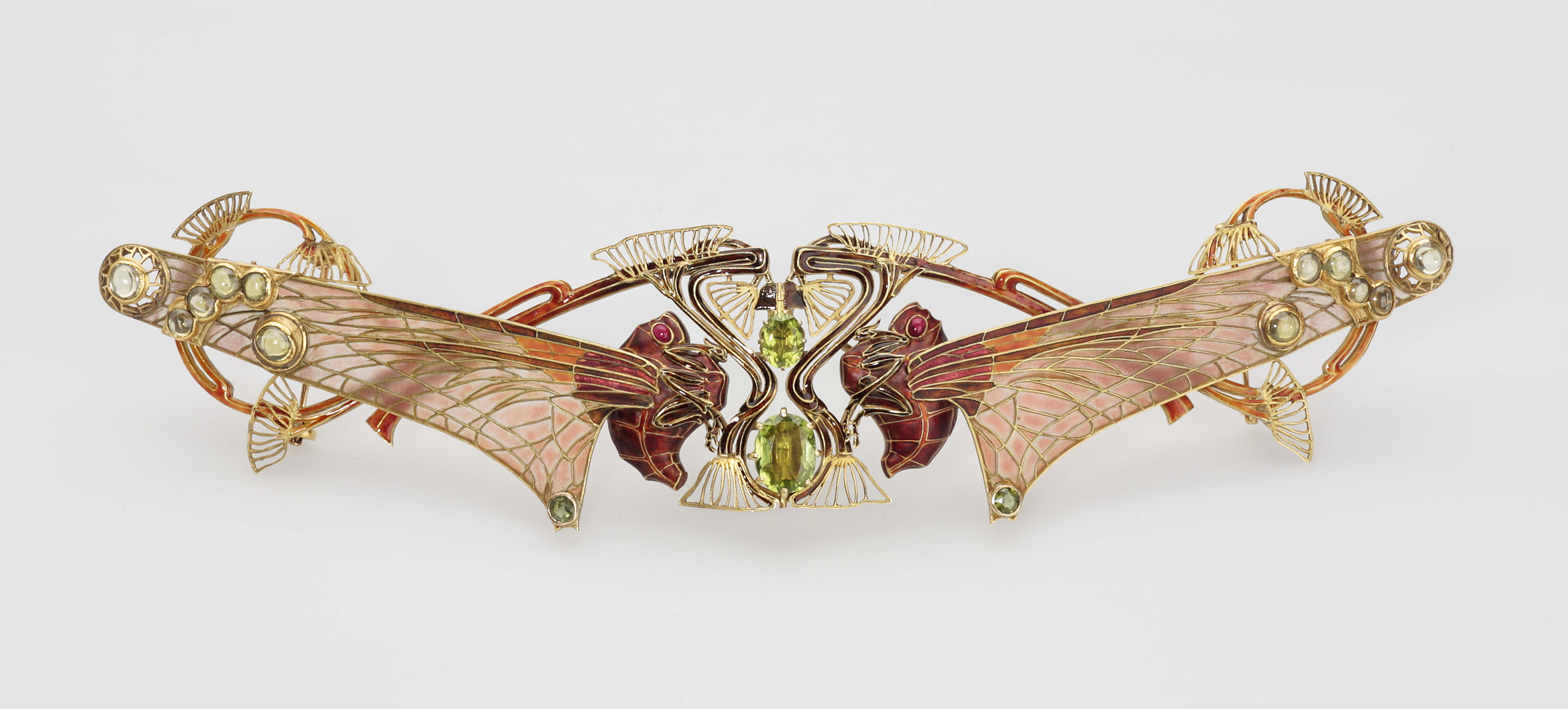
Corsage ornament, Khalili Collection of Enamels of the World

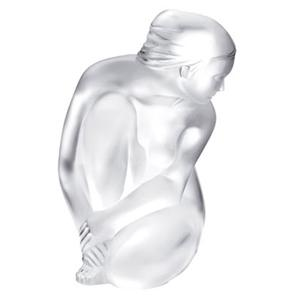
Nude Venus of René Lalique in the Mougins Museum of Classical Art

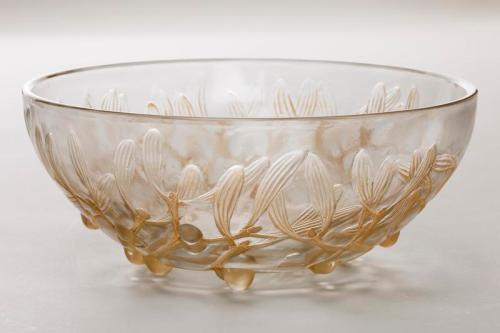
Mistletoe Bowl, Aberdeen Archives, Gallery and Museums

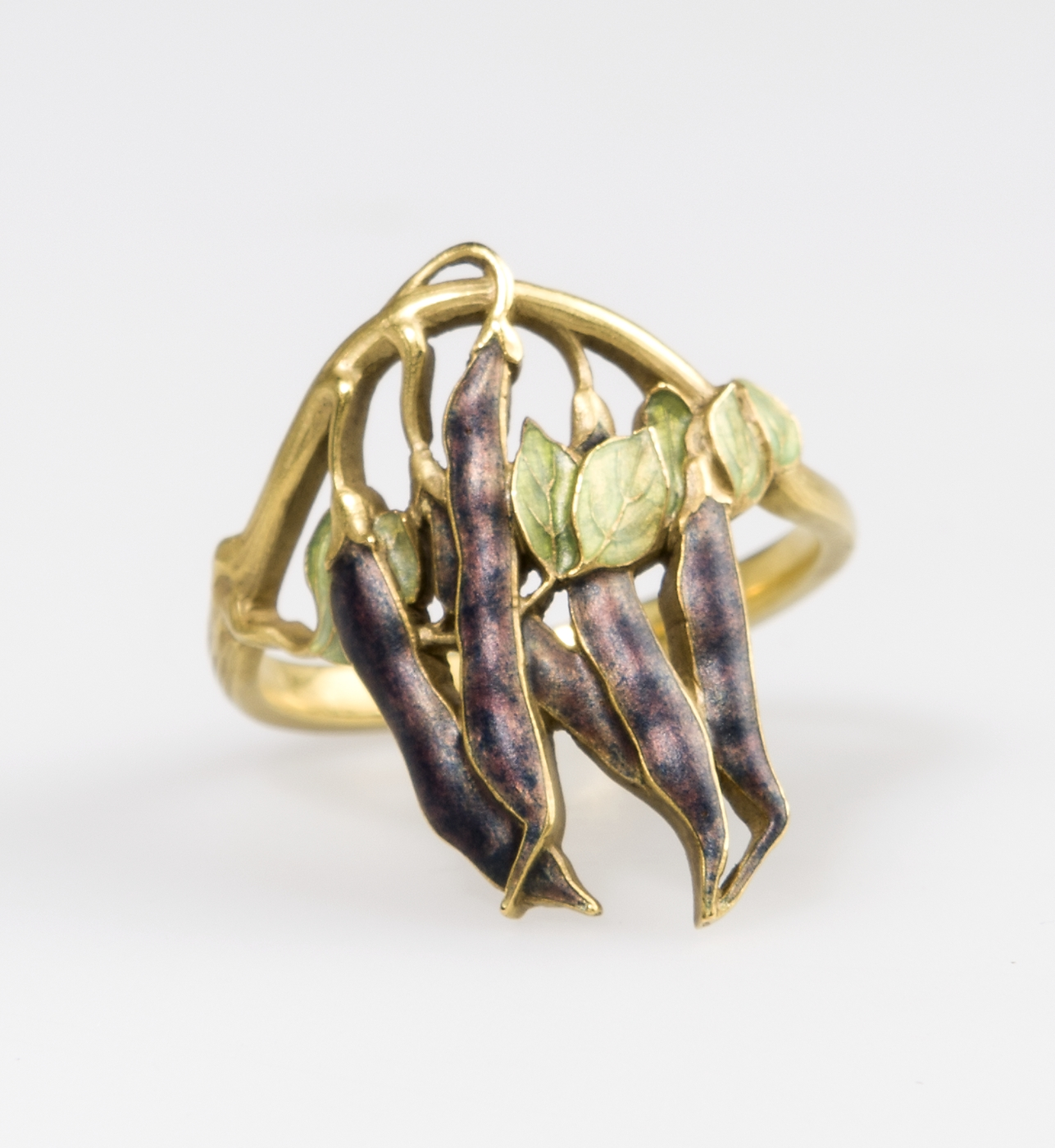
Finger ring with bean pod motif in the Museum of Applied Arts, Vienna

== Honors and awards ==
- Knight of the Order of Legion of Honour (1898)
- Officer of the Order of Legion of Honour (1900)
- Commander of the Order of Legion of Honour (1926)

== See also ==
- Art Nouveau in Paris

== Bibliography ==
- Bayer, Patricia & Waller, Mark: The Art of René Lalique, Bloomsbury Publishing Ltd, London 1988 ISBN 0-7475-0182-3
- Dawes, Nicholas M.: Lalique Glass, Crown Publishers, London 1986 ISBN 978-0-517-55835-5
- Elliott, Kelley J. René Lalique: Enchanted by Glass, The Corning Museum of Glass, Corning, New York 2014. ISBN 978-0-300-20511-4
- Weiner, Geoffrey George Unique Lalique Mascots, The Book Guild Ltd., Brighton 2014 ISBN 978-1909-984219
- Weiner, Geoffrey George Unique Lalique Mascots, Grosvenor House Publishing Co.2020 ISBN 978-1-78623-510-7
- Weiner, Geoffrey George Catalogue Raisonne, The Definitive Collector's Guide to Lalique Automobile Mascots (Decorative Hood Ornaments) published in January 2025 (ISBN / 978-1-80381-886-3)
- "Lalique Mascots - Catalogue Raisonné (or critical catalogue) The Automotive Radiator Hood, Desk Ornaments, Trophies and Bookends of master glass artisan R. Lalique (including auction realisation prices with market values guide" by G.G. Weiner., i.a.m, o.t.r, c.s.m.a. Bi-lingual with both English and French captions. ISBN 978-1-80381-886-3 (in oversize A3 format).
