= Boots Library =

Boots Library may refer to:

- Boots Book-Lovers' Library, circulating library run by Boots the Chemist 1898-1966
- Boots Library, the principal library of Nottingham Trent University
