= Florence Boot =

British businesswoman and benefactor (1863–1952)

Florence Anne Boot, Lady Trent
- Born: 1863; St Helier, Jersey, England, UK
- Died: 1952 (aged 88–89)
- Spouse: Jesse Boot
- Children: Dorothy Florence Boot; Margery Amy Boot; John Boot, 2nd Baron Trent
- Parent: William Rowe

Florence Anne Boot, Lady Trent (1863–1952) was a Jersey businesswoman and philanthropist. She assisted her husband, Jesse Boot, in running Boots chemists after their marriage in 1886. Florence was responsible for diversifying the firm's retail offering to include perfume, cosmetics, stationery, books, and other general merchandise and also pioneered in-store cafés. Florence promoted employee welfare, establishing an athletics club and a school to continue the education of Boots' younger employees. She also made significant donations of land for public use in Jersey and founded the first all-female hall of residence at the University of Nottingham.

== Early life ==
Florence Rowe was born in 1863 in St Helier, Jersey. She was the daughter of bookseller William Rowe and had experience working in his shop selling books, stationery, art equipment, gifts and luxury goods. She met Jesse Boot, owner of the Boot and Co chemists (later known as Boots), when he holidayed in Jersey in 1885. They were married the following year. Florence's mother is said to have refused to attend the wedding in protest of the short engagement. Jesse had travelled to Jersey for health reasons that threatened his career in business. After marriage his health improved and he regained his interest in the firm.

== Boots chemists ==
Florence developed a keen interest in her husband's work and used her strong personality to introduce changes. She used her experience of selling different goods in her father's shop to introduce the sale of stationery, books, artists' materials, and gifts from Boot's shop in Goose Gate, Nottingham. These goods were later rolled out to the company's larger department stores. Florence also persuaded Jesse to introduce the sale of perfumes and cosmetics from separate counters and to diversify further into general merchandise.

Florence designed the interior of the company's flagship Pelham Street, Nottingham, department store for its 1892 opening. This was used as the model for future Boots stores. She also pioneered the introduction of Boots Book-Lovers' Library and cafés into Boots stores by the end of the 19th century in an attempt to attract more middle-class customers into the shops. The decoration of each café was designed by Florence. Libraries were introduced in 1898 and were positioned at the rear of the first floor of stores so that customers had to walk through other departments to reach them, in an attempt to boost sales. Florence purchased the first library stock herself, buying job lots of second hand books. The libraries were rolled out to around half of the company's stores and reached their height in 1938 when 35 million books a year were lent out.

Florence was greatly concerned with ensuring the welfare of the company's employees, particularly female workers. She promoted sports and exercise and helped found the Boots Athletic Club, which was open to all employees. Florence was also keen to ensure that those who left school to join the company were able to continue their education. In February 1920 she founded the Boots Day Continuation School at the firm's Station Street, Nottingham premises. Employees aged 14-16 were granted half a day per week to attend the school. The school later expanded to become Boots College which provided a secondary school curriculum to young employees until 1969 when it was closed following the announcement of the raising of the school-leaving age to 16.

Florence was known as "Lady Florence Boot" after her husband was knighted in 1909 and as "Lady Trent" after he was elevated to the peerage in 1929. Her son, John Boot, succeeded Jesse as chairman of the company in 1926.

== Philanthropy ==
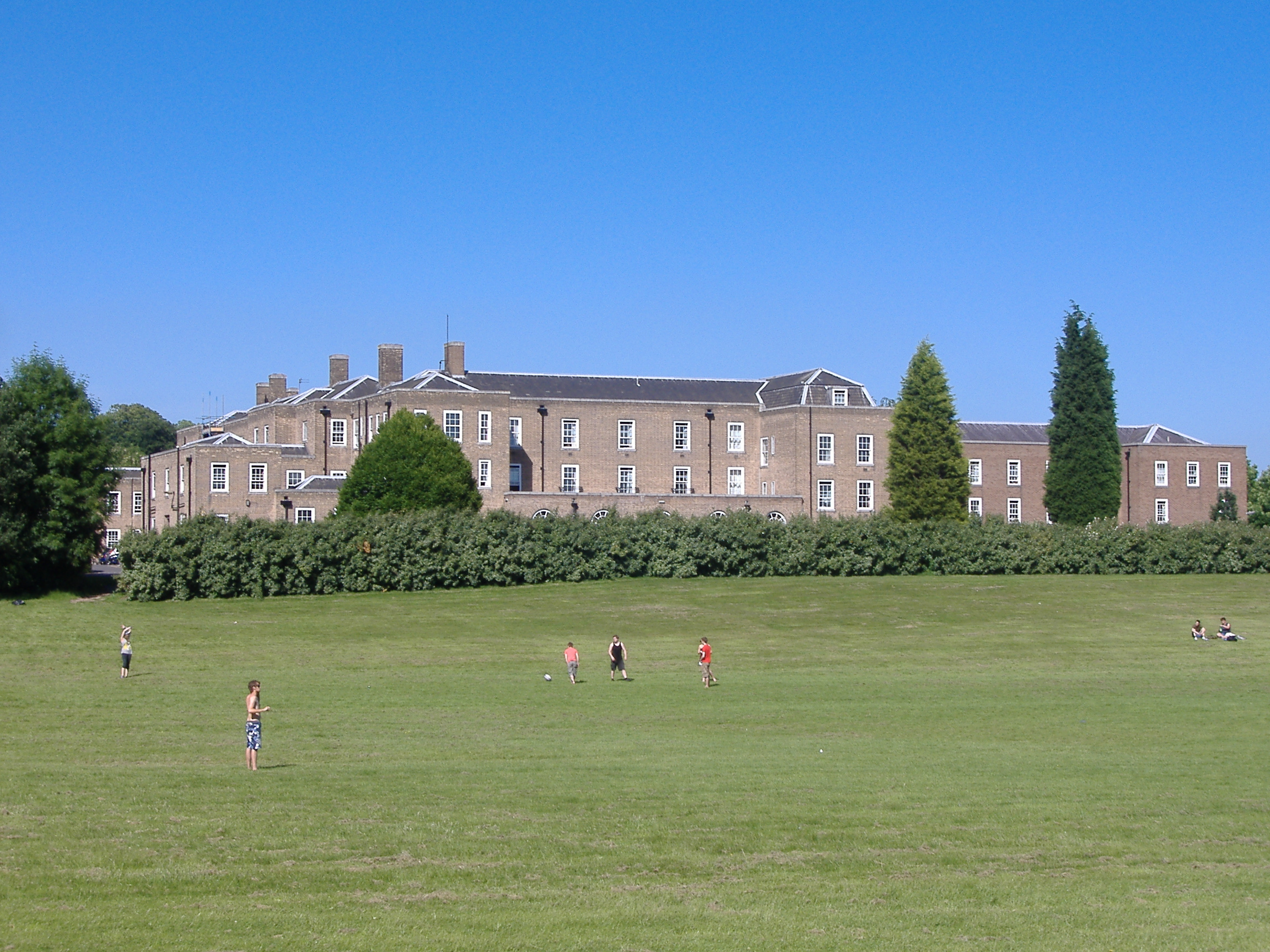
Florence Boot Hall

Florence Boot made significant charitable donations. She bought land and donated it to the people of Jersey for use for exercise and wellbeing, this included sites at Beauport Bay and Coronation Park. She also donated £50,000 to construct houses for the island's poor. She was also a keen campaigner for the right of women to access higher education and founded the first female hall of residence at the University of Nottingham. This building, named Florence Boot Hall in her honour, was sited on University Park which had been donated to the university by Jesse Boot.

== Later life and legacy ==
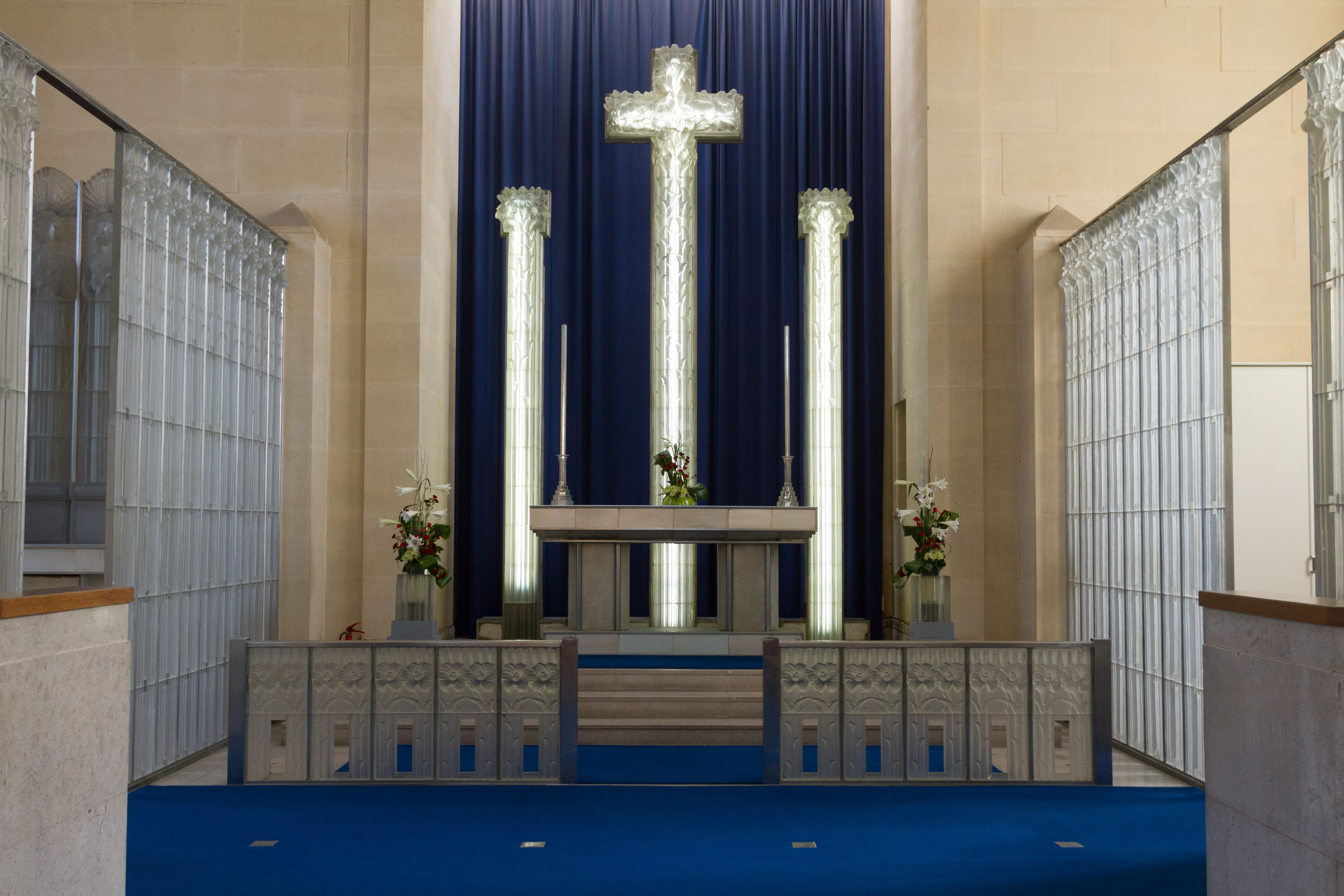
Interior of St Matthew's Church

After her husband's death in 1931, Florence commissioned the rebuilding of St Matthew's Church, in Millbrook, Jersey, with glass interior fittings by René Lalique. Florence died in 1952.

A commemorative plaque in her honour has been erected at her birthplace in St Helier and one of the town's Boots branches still occupies the site of her father's bookshop.
