= Reredos =

Altarpiece, or a screen or decoration behind the altar in a church

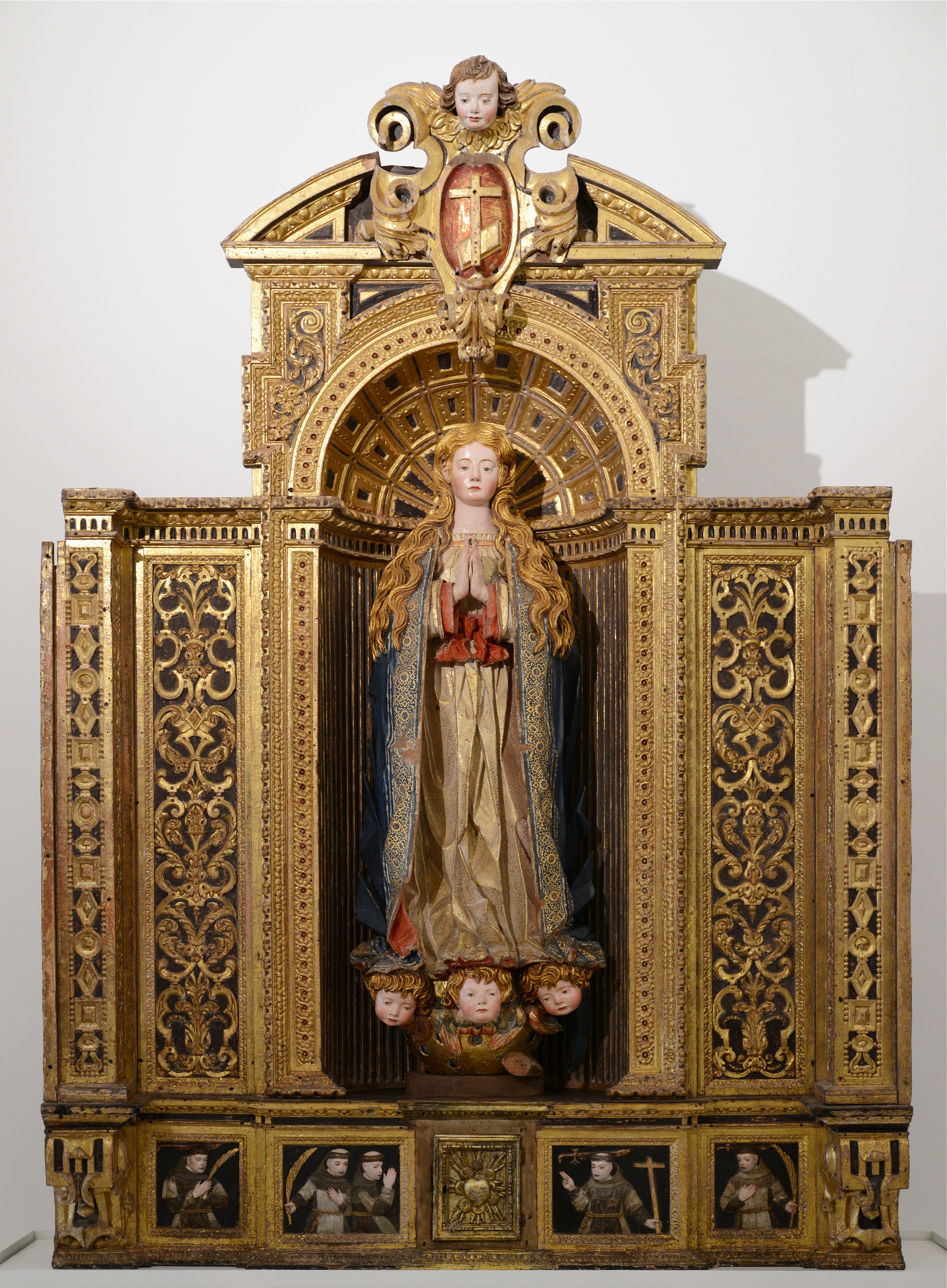
Reredos depicting the Immaculate Conception. Portuguese, 17th century. Santarém, Portugal

A reredos (/ˈrɪərˌdɒs, ˈrɪərɪ-, ˈrɛrɪ-/ REER-dos, REER-ih-, RERR-ih-) is a large altarpiece, a screen, or decoration placed behind the altar in a church. It often includes religious images.

The term reredos may also be used for similar structures, if elaborate, in secular architecture, for example very grand carved chimneypieces. It also refers to a simple, low stone wall placed behind a hearth.

== Description ==
A reredos can be made of stone, wood, metal, ivory, or a combination of materials. The images may be painted, carved, gilded, composed of mosaics, and/or embedded with niches for statues. Sometimes a tapestry or another fabric such as silk or velvet is used.

== Derivation and history of the term ==
Reredos is derived through Middle English from the 14th-century Anglo-Norman areredos, which in turn is from arere 'behind' + dos 'back', from Latin dorsum. (Despite its appearance, the first part of the word is not formed by doubling the prefix "re-", but by an archaic spelling of "rear".) In the 14th and 15th centuries the term referred generally to an open hearth of a fireplace or to a screen placed behind a table, then became nearly obsolete until it was revived in the 19th century.

== Reredos vs. retable ==
The term reredos is sometimes confused with the term retable. While a reredos generally forms or covers the wall behind an altar, a retable is placed either on the altar or immediately behind and attached to the altar. "Many altars have both a reredos and a retable." But this distinction may not always be observed. The retable may have become part of the reredos when an altar was moved away from the wall. For altars that are against the wall, the retable often sits on top of the altar, at the back, particularly when there is no reredos (in which case a dossal curtain or something similar is used instead of a reredos). The retable may hold flowers and candlesticks.

In French (and sometimes in English by confusing the terms), a reredos is called a retable; in Spanish a retablo, etc.

== Gallery ==
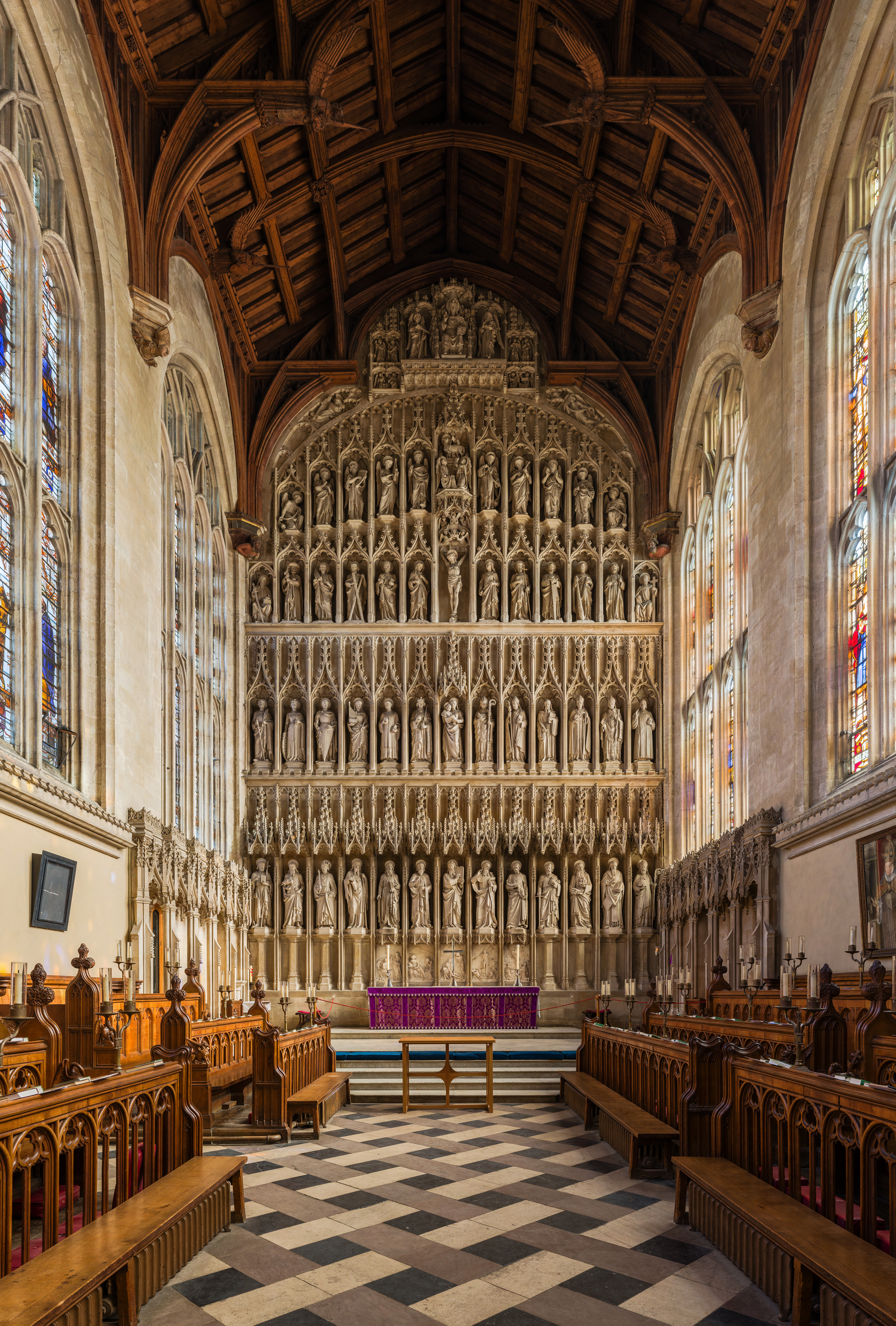
New College, Oxford Chapel reredos, UK.

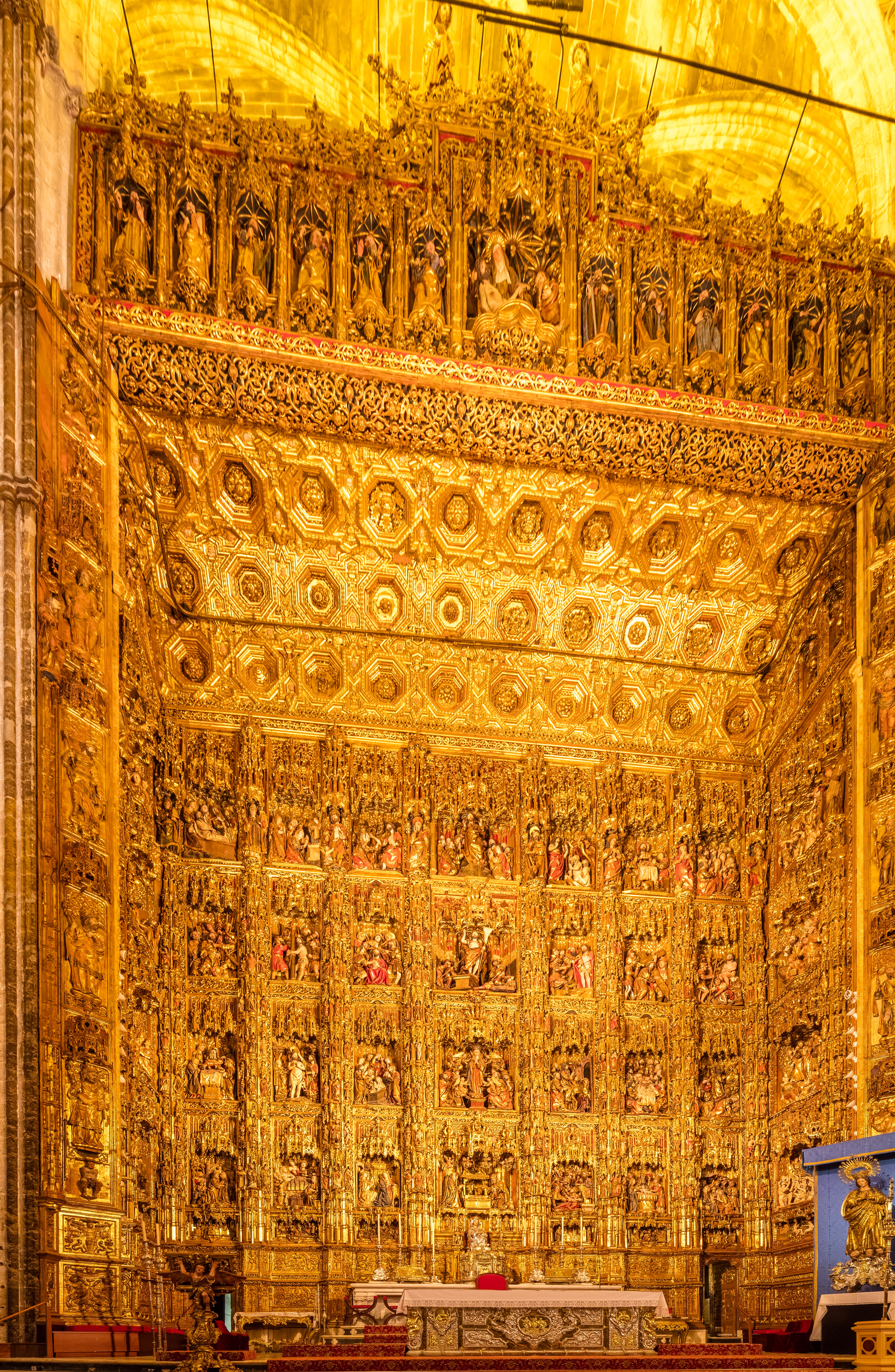
Reredos of Seville Cathedral, one of the largest in the world

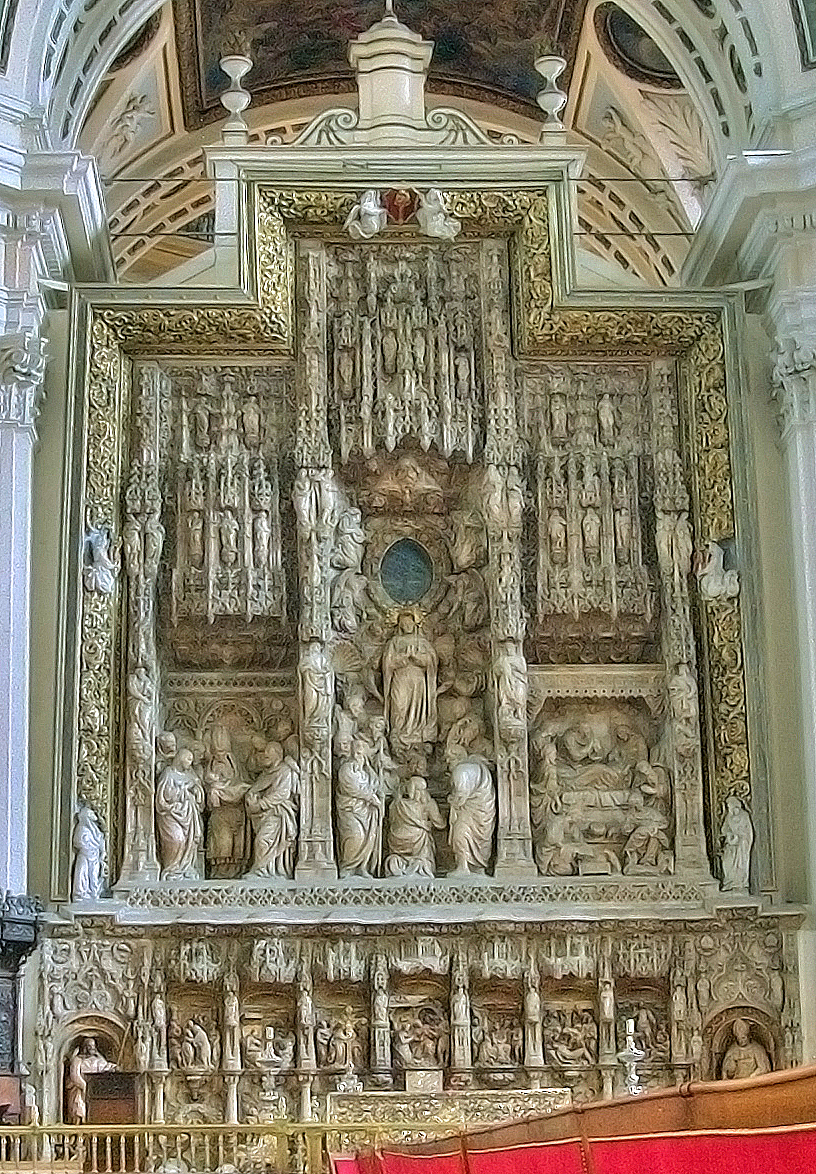
Altar of The Basilica of Our Lady of the Pillar in Zaragoza

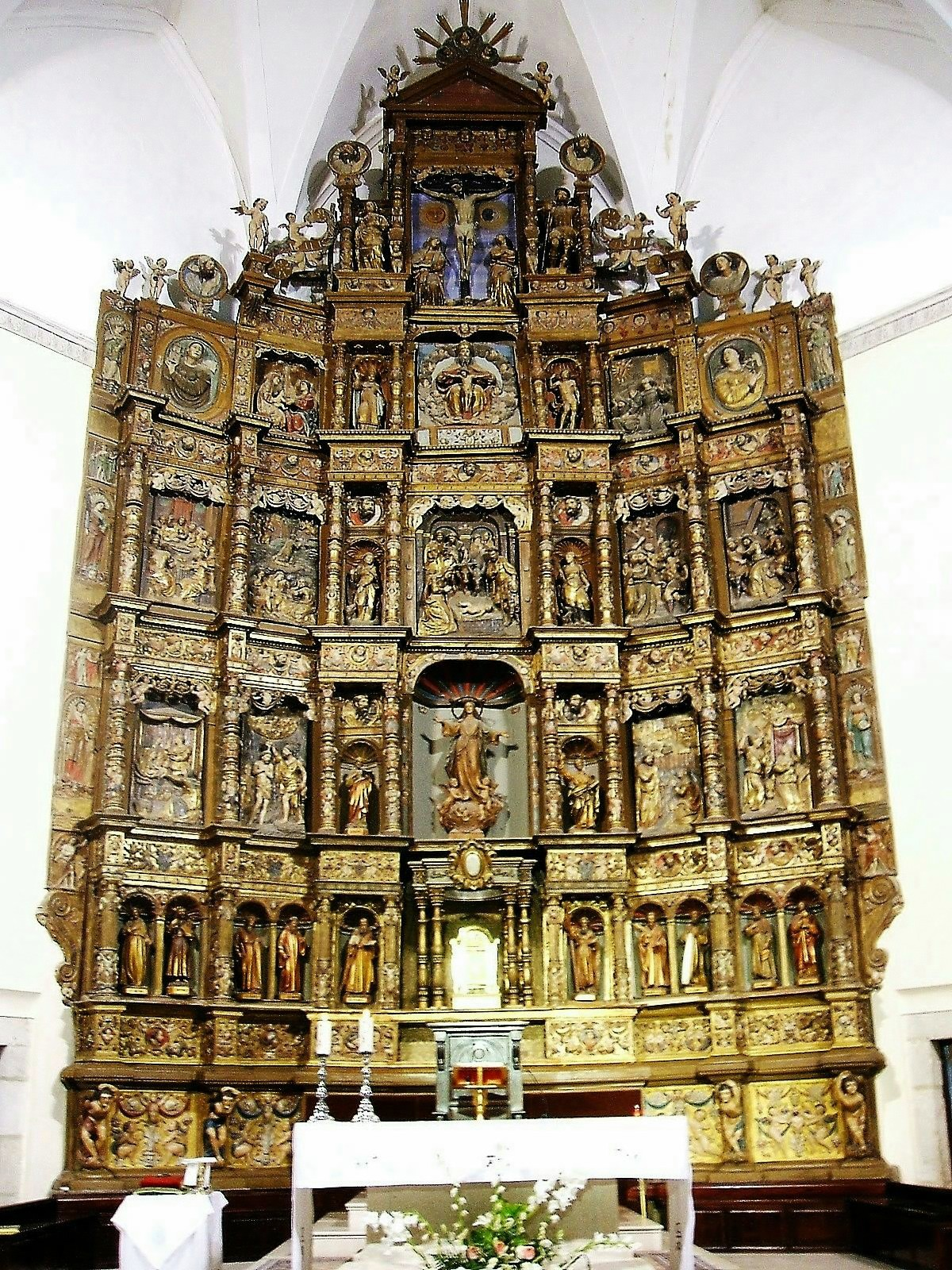
Iglesia de Nuestra Señora de la Asunción, Tarancón

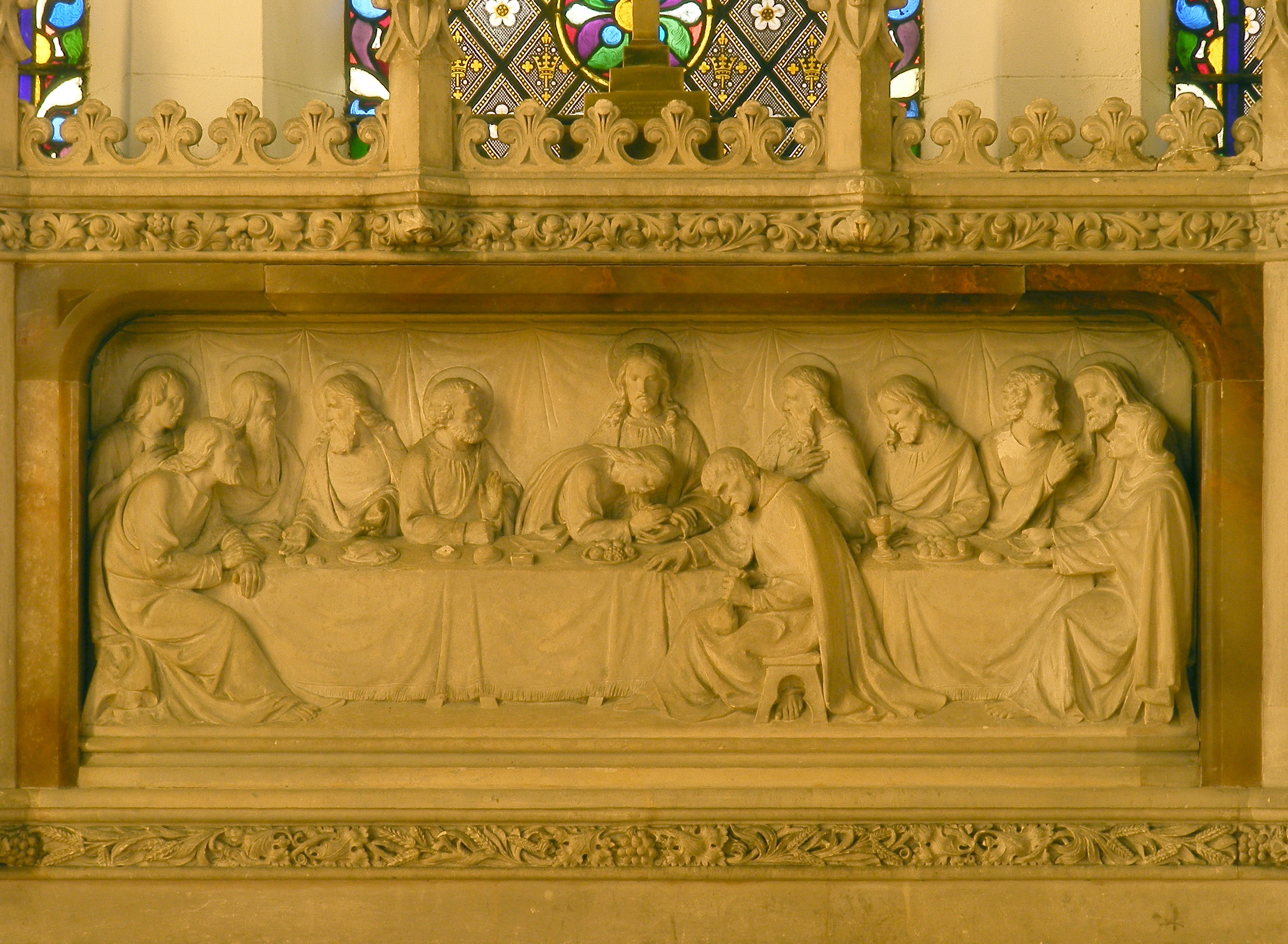
Holy Trinity Church, West Bromwich, war memorial for World War I

The "Grand Retablo", Mission Basilica San Juan Capistrano

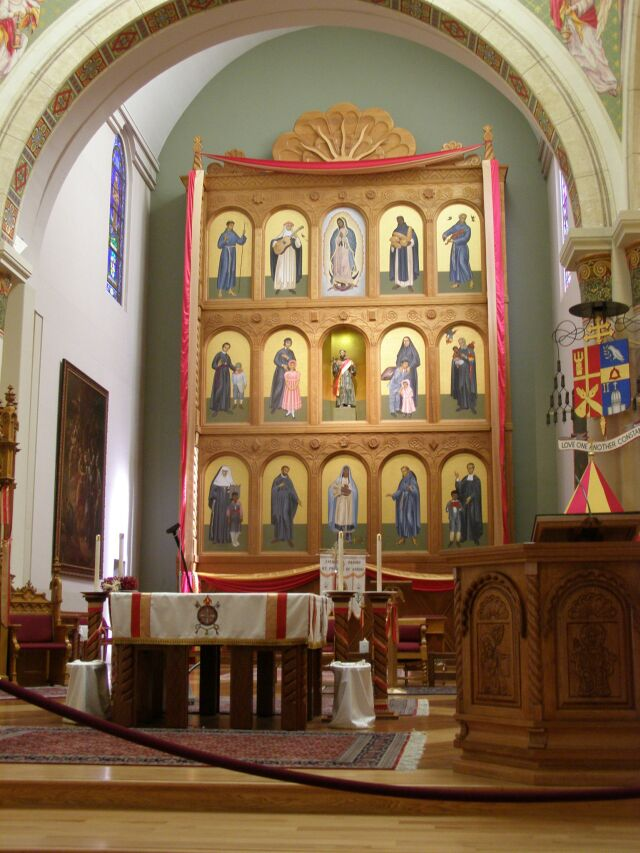
Cathedral Basilica of St. Francis, Santa Fe, New Mexico

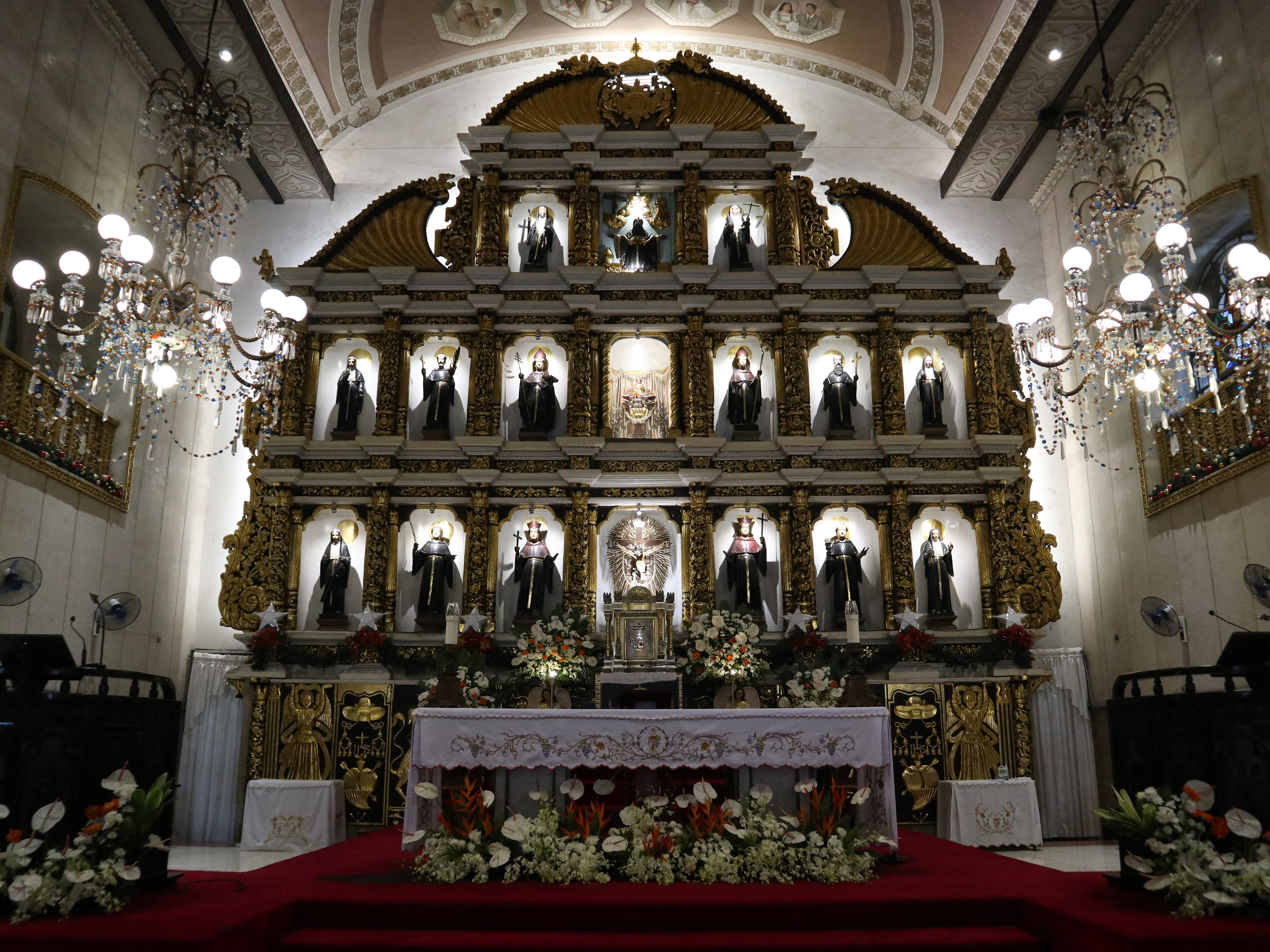
Main altar "retablo" of the Basilica Minore del Sto. Niño in Cebu City, Philippines

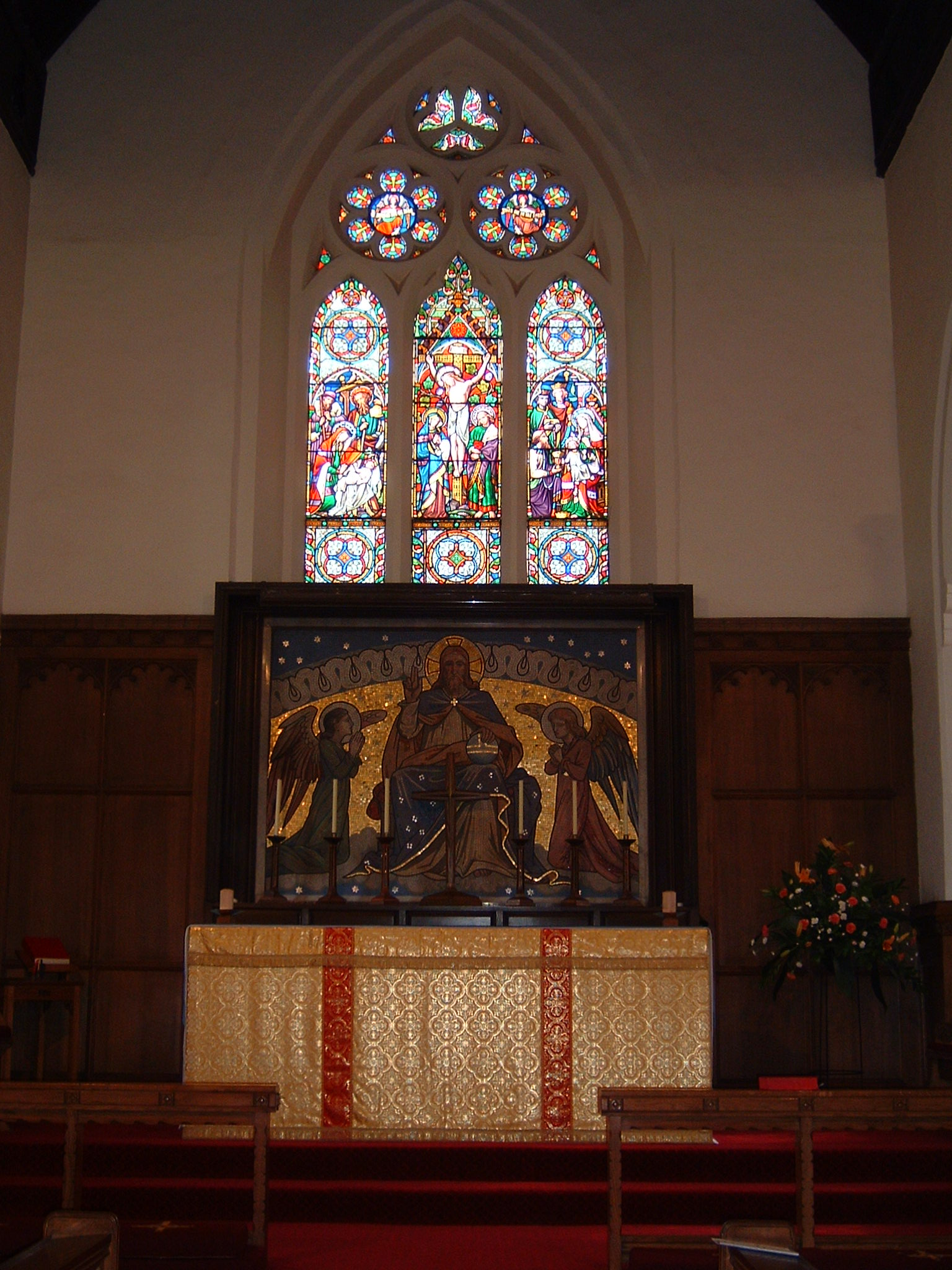
Plain altarpiece painting

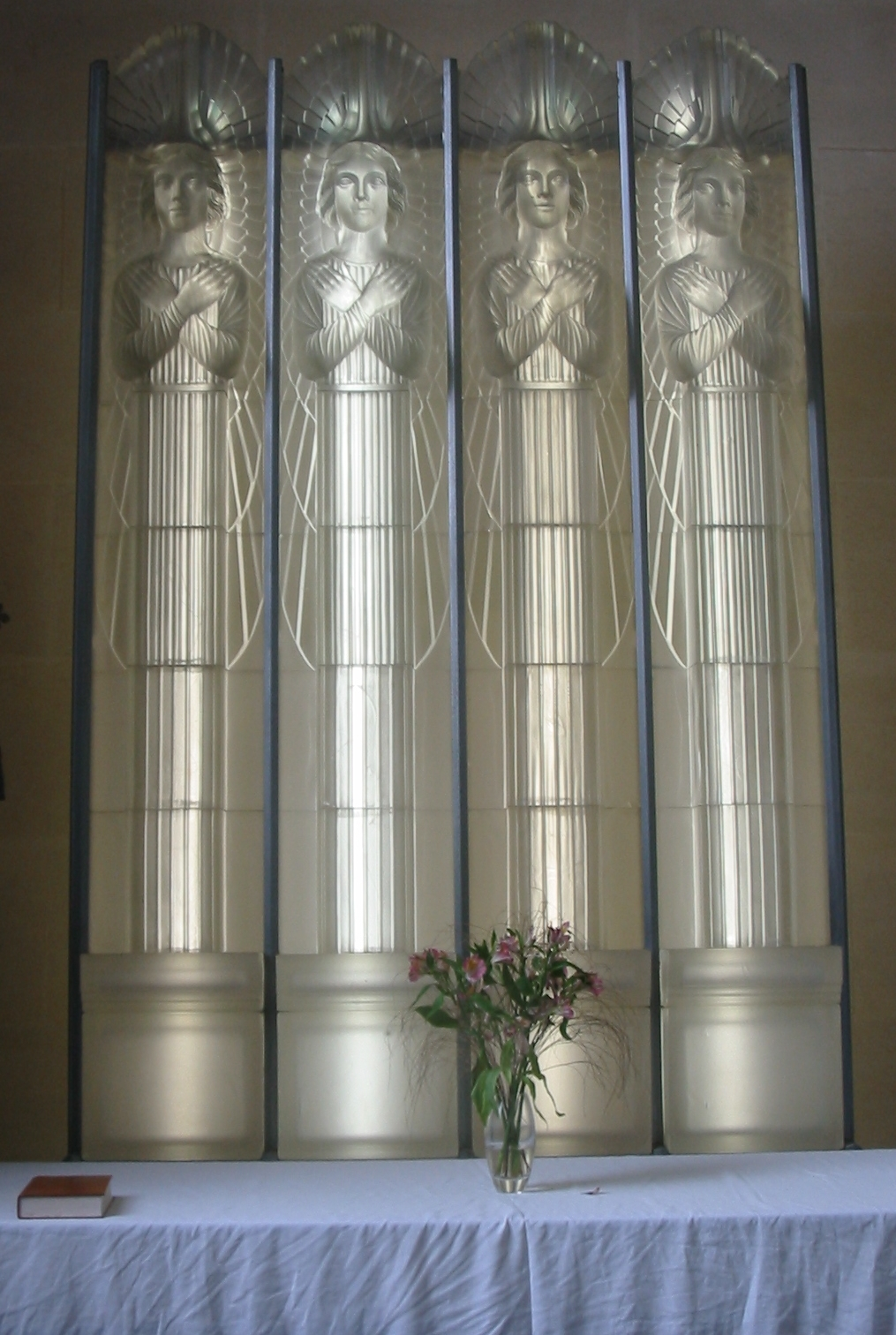
Modern Lalique glass reredos, Saint Matthew's Church ("the Glass Church"), Millbrook, Jersey

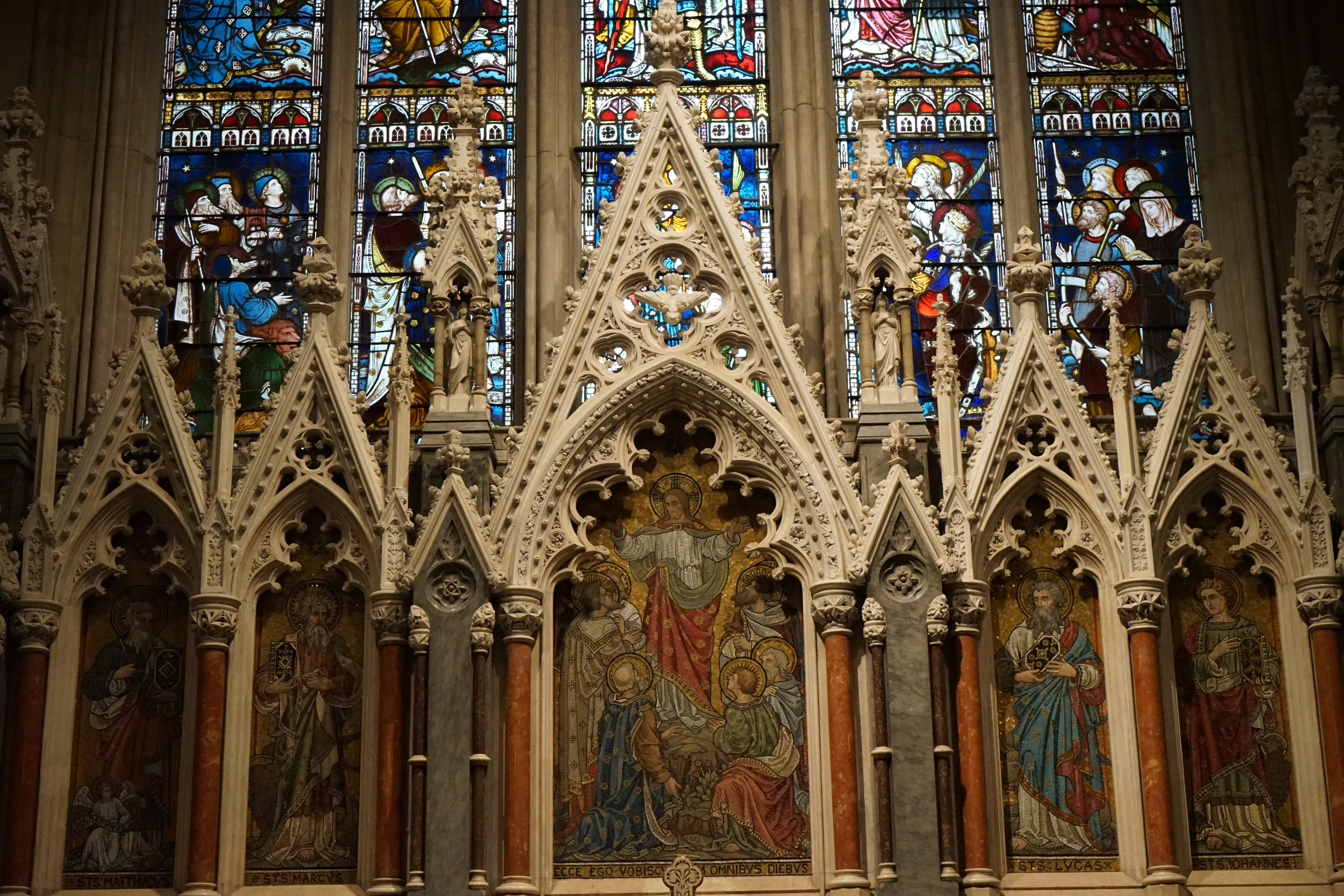
Grace Church in New York Reredos, Grace Church (Manhattan)

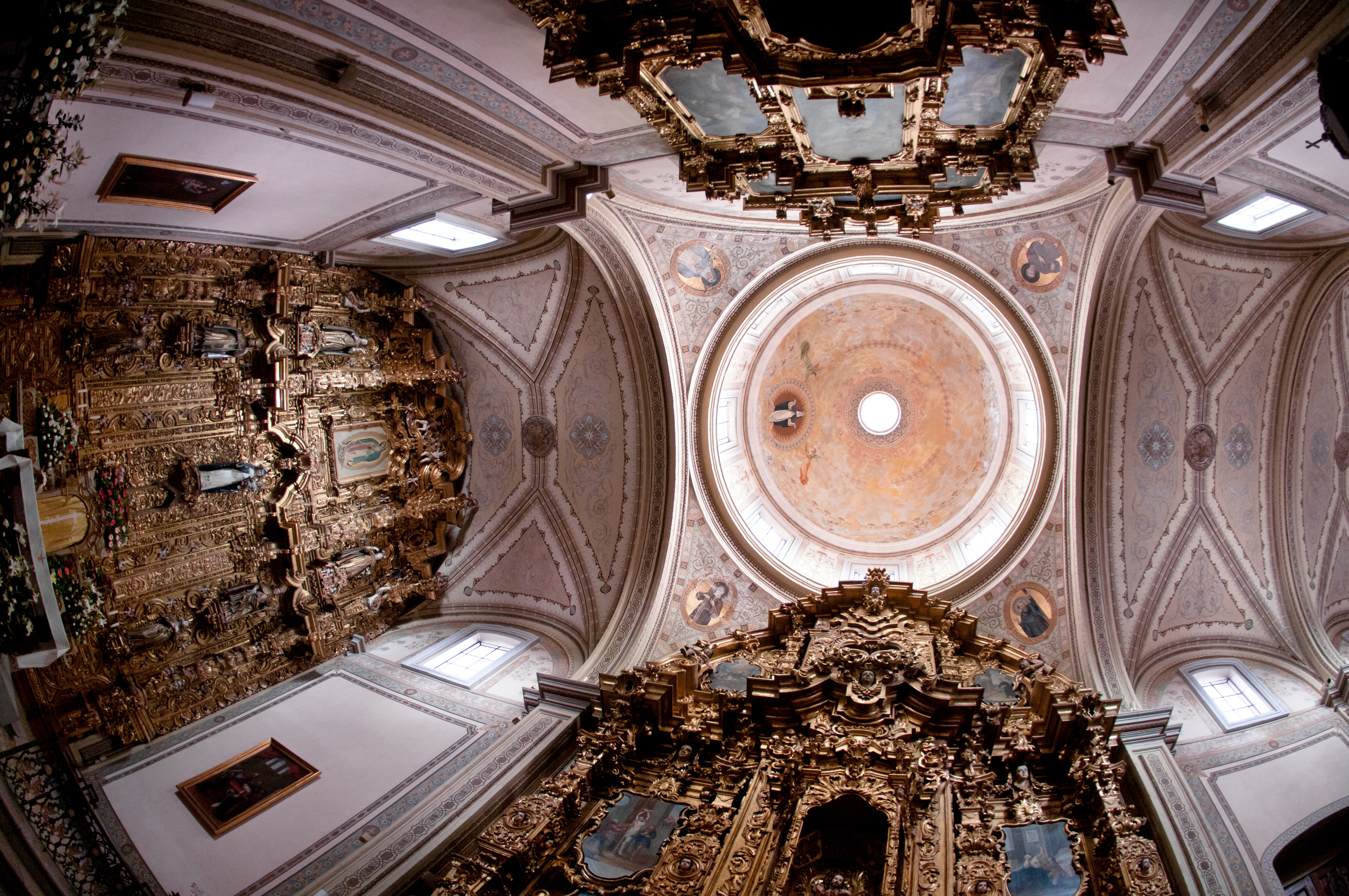
Altarpiece and lateral reredos in the Church of Santa Rosa de Lima in Morelia, Mexico, built in the late 18th century

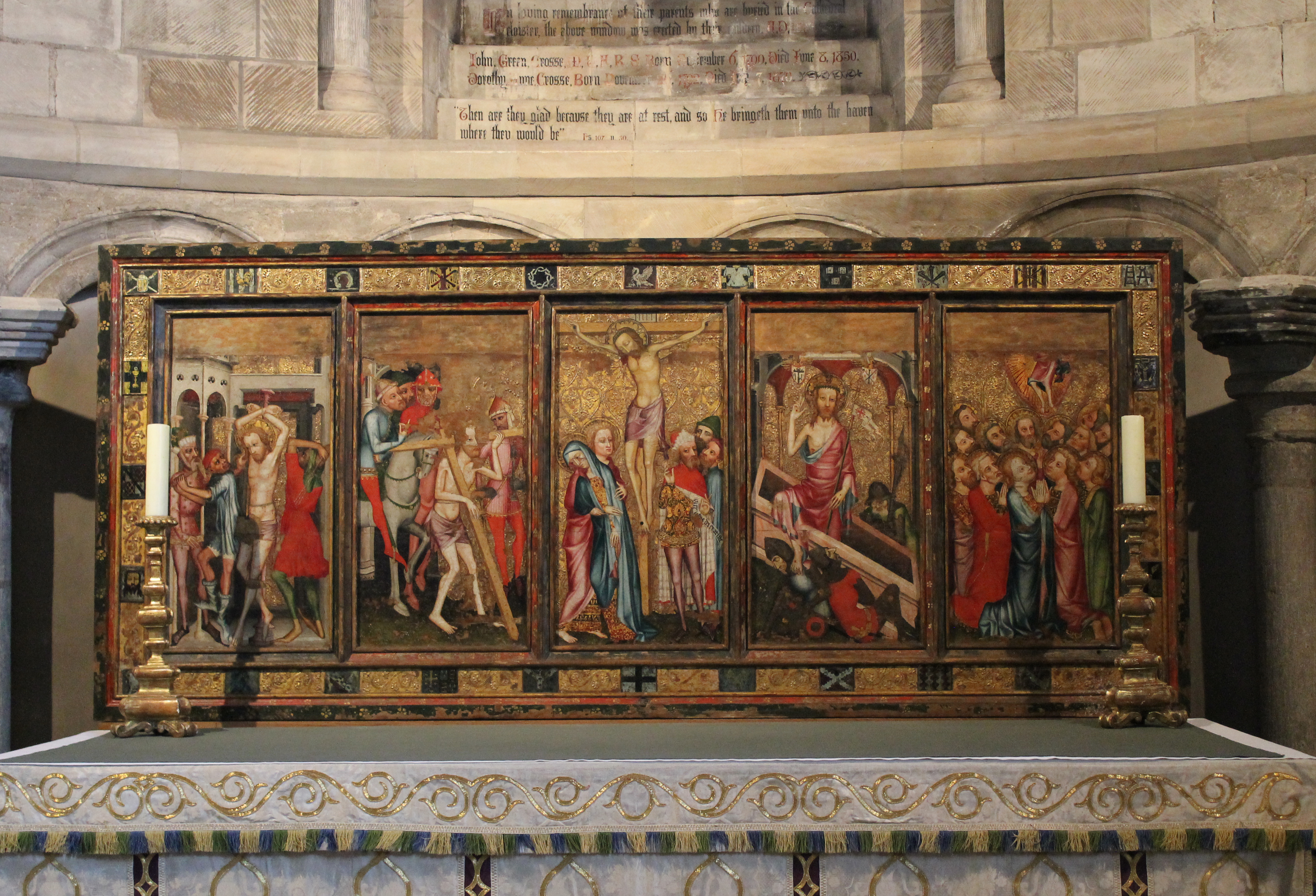
Despenser reredos at Norwich Cathedral, UK

== See also ==
- Altarpiece – Religious artwork behind an altar
- Altar screen – Ornamental cloth or panel hung behind an altar
- Iconostasis – Screen dividing Eastern Orthodox churches
- Retablo – Devotional painting
- Rood screen – Partition found in medieval church architecture
