= Baron Trent =

Extinct barony in the Peerage of the United Kingdom

Baron Trent, of Nottingham in the County of Nottingham, was a title in the Peerage of the United Kingdom. It was created on 18 March 1929 for the businessman and philanthropist Sir Jesse Boot, 1st Baronet. He had already been created a Baronet, of Wilford in the County of Nottingham, in the Baronetage of the United Kingdom on 11 January 1917. He was the son of John Boot, founder of Boots. Lord Trent was succeeded by his son, the second Baron. He was also head of the family business. The titles became extinct on his death in 1956.

== Barons Trent (1929) ==
- Jesse Boot, 1st Baron Trent (1850–1931)
- John Campbell Boot, 2nd Baron Trent (1889–1956)

== Arms ==
Coat of arms of Baron Trent
Crest A lion passant Proper ducally gorged and resting the dexter fore-paw on a burning lamp Or. Escutcheon Argent a chevron between in chief two galleys Sable and in base a rose Gules barbed and seeded Proper. Supporters Dexter a stag reguardant; sinister a lion also reguardant; each charged on the shoulder with an acorn leaved and slipped all Proper. Motto Droit Et Avant
