= St Matthew's Church, Jersey =

Coordinates: 49.198275°N 2.142395°W

St Matthew's, Millbrook
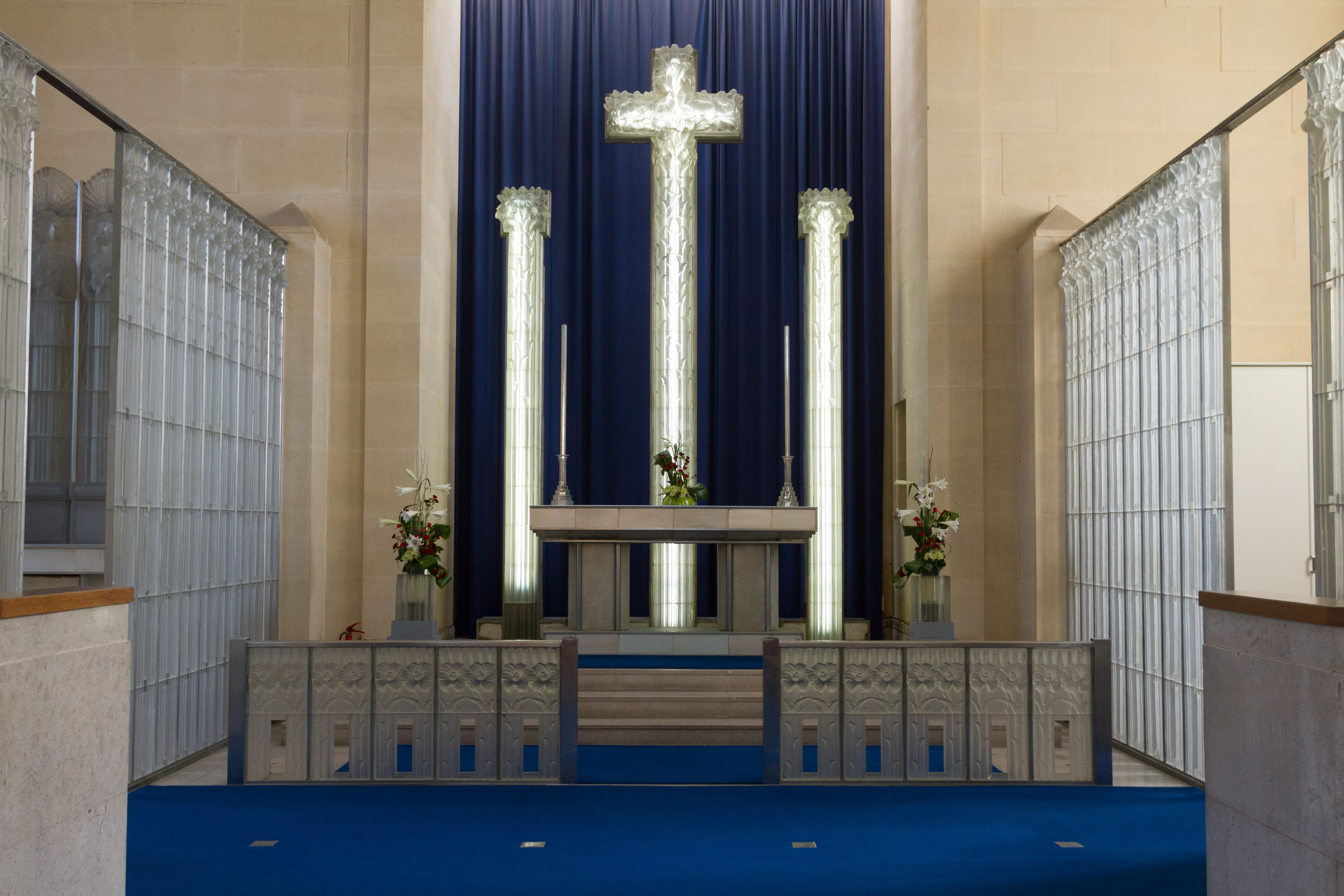
- Church interior featuring glass by René Lalique

- Location in Jersey
- Location: Millbrook, Jersey
- Denomination: Anglican

Architecture
- Functional status: Active
- Completed: 1840

Administration
- Diocese: Winchester
- Archdeaconry: Bournemouth

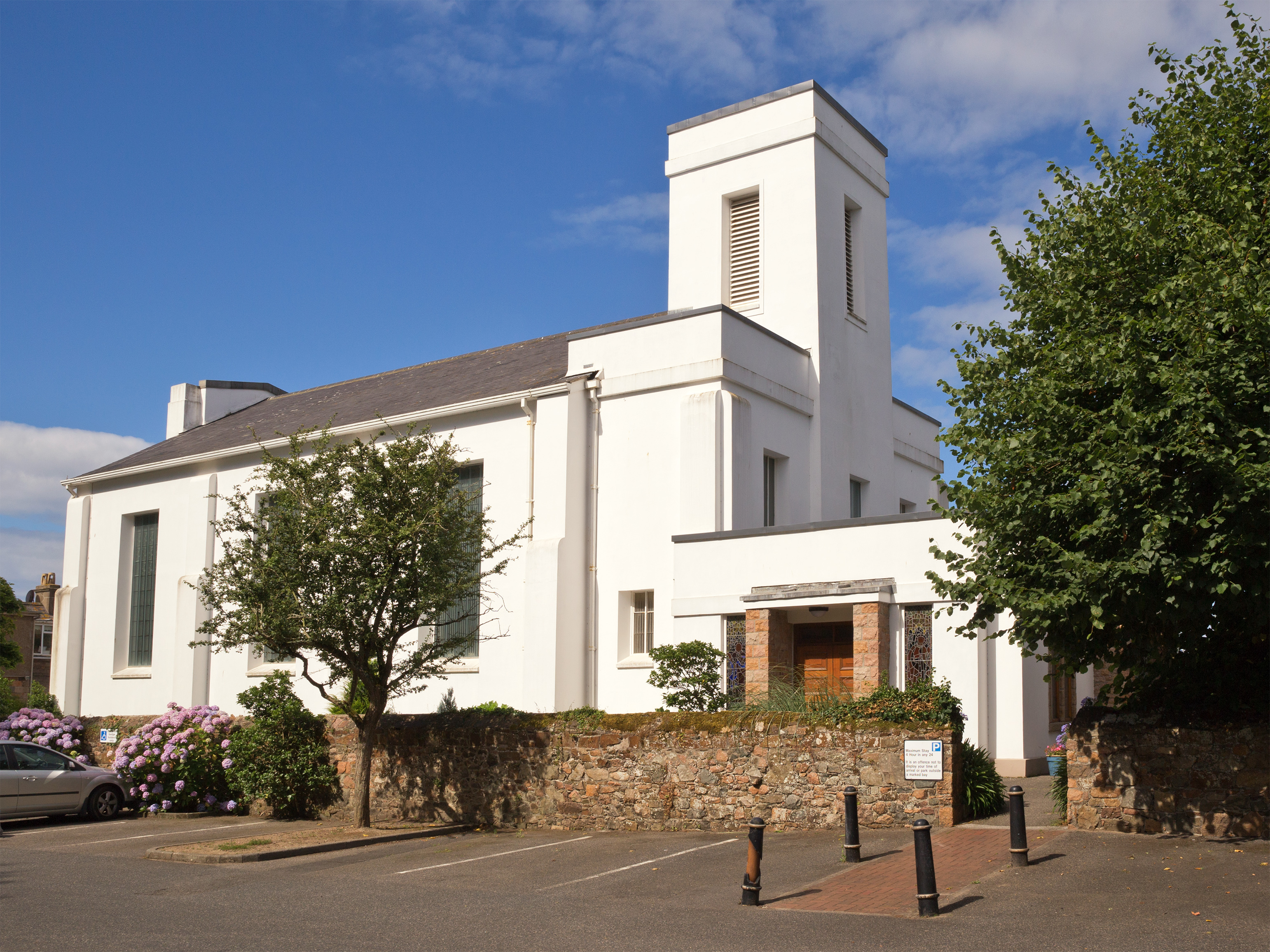
Exterior of the Glass Church

St Matthew's Church, also known as the Glass Church, is an Anglican church in Millbrook, in the parish of Saint Lawrence, Jersey, in the Channel Islands. Built in 1840, the church is known for its glass-work by René Lalique added later.

== History ==
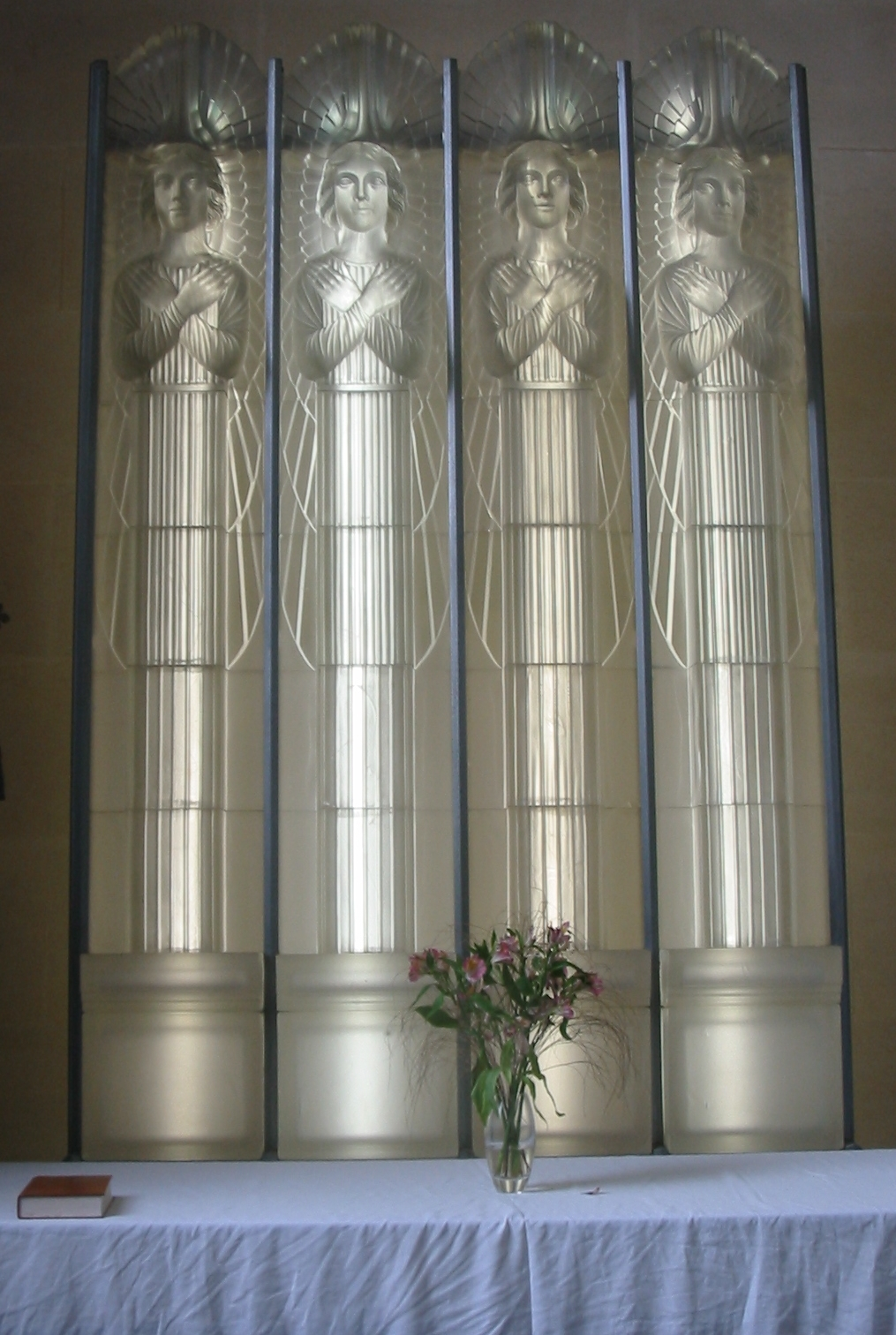
Lalique glass altarpiece

St Matthew's was built in 1840 as a chapel of ease. It was constructed at the bottom of Mont Felard for the benefit of parishioners whom were unable to climb the hill to attend St Lawrence's Church. In 1934, Florence Boot, Lady Trent, the widow of Jesse Boot of Boots the Chemists, commissioned an extensive renovation of the church by architect A. B. Grayson and French glass designer René Lalique. According to BBC News, the church is noted as "the only remaining and complete example of ... Lalique's heavy, clouded glass."

== Assessment and administration ==
On 26 September 2008, St Matthew's was listed as a Site of Special Interest by Jersey Heritage for its architectural, historical and artistic special interest. In 2010 the church received £125,000 worth of funding for restoration.

St Matthew's is an active Church of England church in the Diocese of Salisbury (formerly under the Diocese of Winchester, but was transferred to Salisbury in 2022 which is part of the Province of Canterbury. The church is part of the Deanery of Jersey. As of 2010, the church's vicar is the Reverend Philip James Warren. In 2024, the church applied for planning permission to demolish its church hall and vicarage in order build a new community centre in its place. This was because the vicarage was costing too much to maintain while lacking disability access and the hall was unable to host certain groups due to its size.

== See also ==
- Religion in Jersey
