= Madeline Martin =

American author of historical fiction

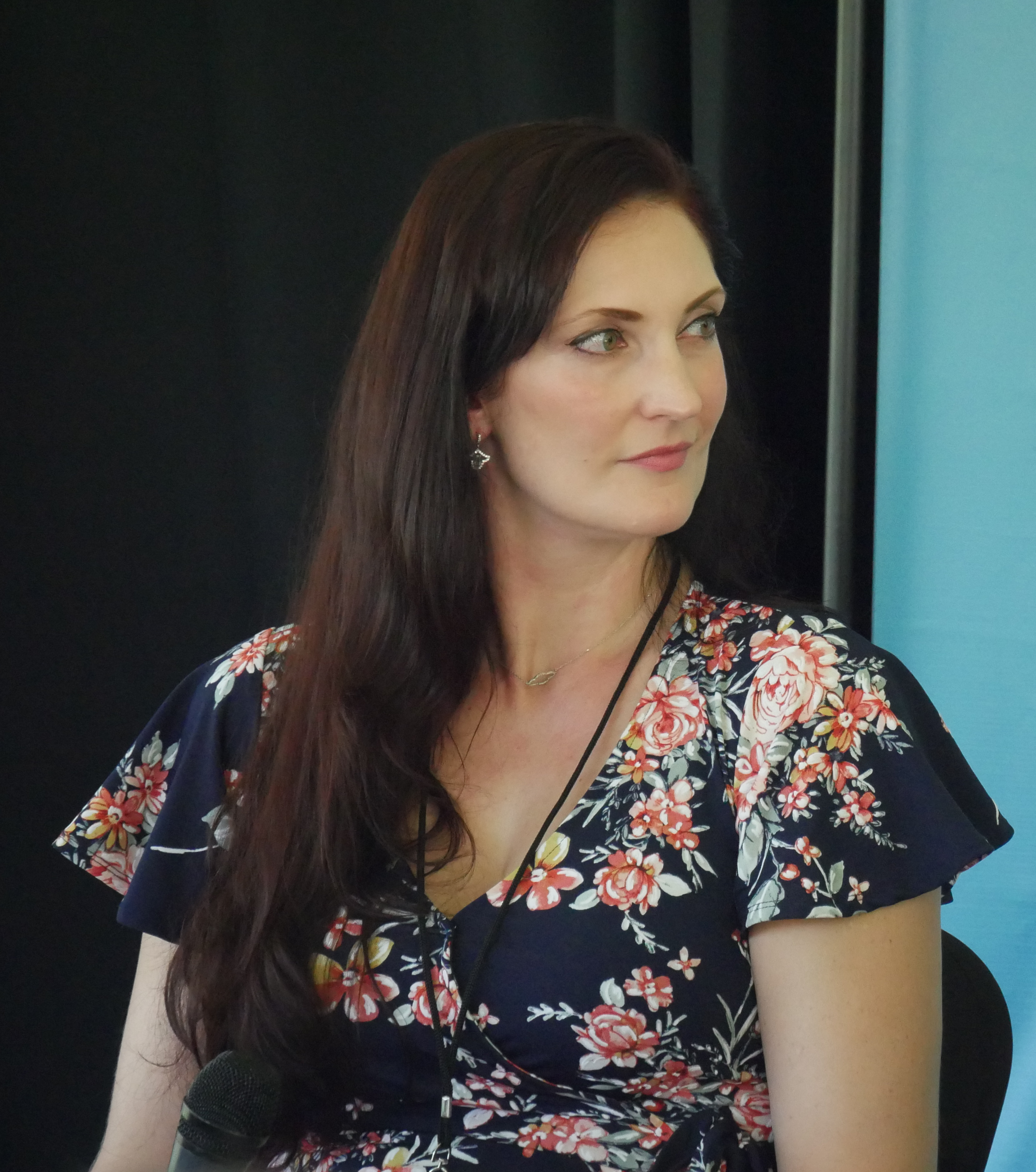
- Born: 1980 (age 45–46)
- Occupation: Novelist
- Writing career
- Genres: Historical fiction; historical romance
- Website: madelinemartin.com

Madeline Martin is an American author of historical fiction and historical romance.

Martin has published eight romance series, and six stand-alone historical novels: The Last Bookshop in London (2021), The Librarian Spy (2022), The Keeper of Hidden Books (2023), The Booklover's Library (2024), The Secret Book Society (2025), and A Time of Witches (2026). Four of the novels are set primarily in Europe during World War II. All her books include themes related to the importance of literature.

Martin grew up in Germany as an Army brat. As of 2024, she lives in Florida with her husband and children.

== Books ==
=== The Last Bookshop in London (2021) ===
The Last Bookshop in London: A Novel of World War II was published by Hanover Square Press in April 2021.

The novel begins in August 1939 as Grace Bennet's mother dies. With her best friend Viv, Grace decides to move from the English countryside to London, where the pair will live with her mother's friend, Mrs. Weatherford, and seek employment. After failing to secure a job at the department store Harrods, unlike Viv, Grace attains employment at Primrose Hill Books, a small bookstore, despite her lack of interest in reading. As she tidies the store and begins to enjoy reading, World War II begins in earnest, including The Blitz, which destroys London. Many Grace connects with, including Viv, join the fight against Hitler, while Grace remains to care for the bookstore, eventually working to ensure the store and the books within are not destroyed.

The Last Bookshop in London received positive reviews from critics, particularly regarding characterization and historical detail.

Themes include the value of compassion and grit.

=== The Librarian Spy (2022) ===
The Librarian Spy was published by Hanover Square Press in July 2022. The audiobook is read by Saskia Maarleveld.

The novel begins in the United States before the beginning of World War II and focuses on two characters: Ava and Elaine. Ava is a librarian at the Library of Congress who receives an offer from the United States Armed Forces to work as a government spy in Lisbon, Portugal. Elaine is in occupied France, working for a resistance printing press. Throughout the novel, Ava and Elaine connect through coded messages.

=== The Keeper of Hidden Books (2023) ===
The Keeper of Hidden Books was published by Hanover Square Press in August 2023.

Like The Last Bookshop in London, this novel begins in August 1939, though The Keeper of Hidden Books takes place in Warsaw, Poland. Zofia Nowak and her best friend Janina are finishing secondary school and love books. Along with others, the girls complete their Girl Guides training and form a book club devoted to reading texts banned by the Nazis. Sooner than expected, the Nazis invade Poland, and the girls cannot finish school, instead beginning work at their local library. Meanwhile, Zofia's father, a doctor, hides books beneath the floorboards before being imprisoned, and her brother joins the resistance. As the book continues, restrictions against the Jewish population grow, and Janina is forced into the Warsaw Ghetto. Zofia quickly matures as she decides to continue taking a stand against Hitler, starting by hiding and circulating books Hitler wants out of Polish hands.

Sarah Hendess, writing for the Historical Novel Society, described the novel as "both heartbreaking and timely". While describing the various ways Warsovians harmed one another during the occupation, Maggie Boyd, writing for All About Romance, noted that Martin excels in showing "what it means when tyrants are in charge and how that actually looks for the folks suffering under their rule". However, Boyd explained that much of the story is developed around "action and worry", resulting in characters that feel underdeveloped, with their sole focus being on the present moment.

Themes include "friendship, freedom, and the power of literature".

=== The Booklover's Library (2024) ===
The Booklover's Library was published by Hanover Square Press in September 2024. The audiobook is read by Saskia Maarleveld.

The novel begins in England in 1939 and follows Emma Taylor, whose family has all died aside from her daughter, Olivia. With World War II on the horizon, Emma seeks employment. Through good will and her father's reputation, she secures a job at the Booklover's Library. However, she must conceal that she's a widow with a child. The effects of World War II hit England, and Olivia is sent to the countryside.

Researchers praised the historical details. Themes include strength and courage amid disaster, as well as the "power of friendship and community and the comfort of books".

=== The Secret Book Society (2025) ===
The Secret Book Society was published by Hanover Square Press in August 2025. The audiobook is read by Saskia Maarleveld.

Unlike Martin's previous novels, The Secret Book Society is set in Victorian England. Women who disobey orders about the books they can read are sent to the Bethlehem Royal Hospital. In June 1985, Clara Chambers, the Countess of Duxbury, sends invitations to three women for a secret book society under the guise of tea. Eleanor Clarke, Rose Wharton, and Lady Lavinia Cavendish meet with Lady Duxbury over tea to read otherwise forbidden books and learn about medicinal plants that can heal or harm.

The novel has feminist themes.

== Publications ==
=== Historical fiction ===
- The Last Bookshop in London. Hanover Square Press. 2021. ISBN 978-1-335-28480-8.
- The Librarian Spy. Hanover Square Press. 2022. ISBN 978-1-335-42748-9.
- The Keeper of Hidden Books. Hanover Square Press. 2023. ISBN 978-1-335-00577-9.
- The Booklover's Library. Hanover Square Press. 2024. ISBN 978-1-335-00039-2.
- The Secret Book Society. Hanover Square Press. 2025. ISBN 978-1-335-01628-7.
- A Time of Witches. Harlequin Enterprises. 2026. ISBN 9781335003928.

=== Romance novels ===
==== Borderland Rebels ====
- The Highlander’s Lady Knight. Oliver Heber Publishing. 2022. ISBN 979-8-364-64435-0.
- Faye’s Sacrifice. Oliver Heber Publishing. 2022. ISBN 979-8-364-64422-0.
- Kinsey’s Defiance. Oliver Heber Publishing. 2022. ISBN 979-8-364-64393-3.
- Clara's Vow. Oliver Heber Publishing. 2022. ISBN 979-8-364-64378-0.
- Drake’s Honor. Oliver Heber Publishing. 2022. ISBN 979-8-364-64372-8.

==== Heart of the Highlands ====
- Deception of a Highlander. Oliver Heber Publishing. 2022. ISBN 979-8-838-79890-9.
- Possession of a Highlander. Oliver Heber Publishing. 2022. ISBN 979-8-364-50482-1.
- Enchantment of a Highlander. Oliver Heber Publishing. 2022. ISBN 9781626819221.

==== Highland Passions ====
- A Ghostly Tale of Forbidden Love. Oliver Heber Publishing. 2022. ISBN 979-8-364-61887-0.
- The Madam’s Highlander. Oliver Heber Publishing. 2022. ISBN 978-1-985-03129-6.
- Her Highland Destiny. Oliver Heber Publishing. 2022. ISBN 979-8-364-61902-0.
- The Highlander’s Untamed Lady. Oliver Heber Publishing. 2022. ISBN 979-8-364-61915-0.

==== London School for Ladies ====
- How to Tempt a Duke. Oliver Heber Publishing. 2019. ISBN 978-0-263-26950-5.
- How to Start a Scandal. Oliver Heber Publishing. 2020. ISBN 978-1-335-50566-8.
- How to Wed a Courtesan. Oliver Heber Publishing. 2021. ISBN 978-1-335-40721-4.

==== Matchmaker of Mayfair ====
- Discovering the Duke. Oliver Heber Publishing. 2022. ISBN 979-8-364-61746-0.
- Unmasking the Earl. Oliver Heber Publishing. 2022. ISBN 979-8-364-61764-4.
- Mesmerizing the Marquis. Oliver Heber Publishing. 2022. ISBN 978-1-730-92478-1.
- Earl of Benton. Oliver Heber Publishing. 2022. ISBN 978-1-986-13573-3.
- Earl of Oakhurst. Oliver Heber Publishing. 2022. ISBN 979-8-364-61683-8.
- Earl of Kendal. Oliver Heber Publishing. 2022. ISBN 979-8-364-61723-1.

==== Mercenary Maidens ====
- Highland Spy. Oliver Heber Publishing. 2023. ISBN 978-1648393877.
- Highland Ruse. Oliver Heber Publishing. 2023. ISBN 978-1648394294.
- Highland Wrath. Oliver Heber Publishing. 2023. ISBN 978-1648395178.

==== Wedding a Wallflower ====
- The Earl’s Hoyden. Oliver Heber Publishing. 2022. ISBN 979-8-364-51228-4.
- The Rake’s Convenient Bride. Oliver Heber Publishing. 2024. ISBN 978-1-648-39770-7.

==== Standalone novels ====
- Her Highland Beast. Oliver Heber Publishing. 2022. ISBN 979-8-364-51849-1.
- The Highlander’s Challenge. Oliver Heber Publishing. 2022. ISBN 978-1-089-35499-4.
- The Highlander’s Stolen Bride. Oliver Heber Publishing. 2022. ISBN 978-1-335-40773-3.
