= John Boot, 2nd Baron Trent =

British retail businessman (1889–1956)

The Right Honourable The Lord Trent KBE
- Born: 19 January 1889
- Died: 8 March 1956 (aged 67)
- Education: Jesus College, Cambridge, University of Nottingham
- Occupation: Retail businessman
- Parent(s): Jesse Boot, 1st Baron Trent (father), Florence Boot
- Family: John Boot (grandfather)
- Honours: Lord Trent Chair of Pharmaceutical Chemistry; Lady Trent Chair of Chemical Engineering (named for him)

John Campbell Boot, 2nd Baron Trent, KBE (19 January 1889 – 8 March 1956), was a British retail businessman, the son of the Sir Jesse Boot who turned the pharmaceutical retailer Boots Company into a major national company, and Florence Boot.

== Biography ==
Boot was educated at The Leys School and Jesus College, Cambridge, and served in the First World War. In 1914 he married Margaret Pyman and had four daughters.

The 2nd Lord Trent continued his father's expansion of the company. Like his father, he was also a philanthropist who was keenly involved with the City of Nottingham. In 1944 he was appointed President of University College, Nottingham, and, after it was granted full university status in 1948 as the University of Nottingham, became its first Chancellor.

Following Lord Trent's retirement as Chancellor, the Boots Company endowed the Lord Trent Chair of Pharmaceutical Chemistry and Lady Trent Chair of Chemical Engineering in his honour.

== Coat of Arms ==
Coat of arms of John Boot, 2nd Baron Trent
Crest A lion passant Proper ducally gorged and resting the dexter fore-paw on a burning lamp Or. Escutcheon Argent a chevron between in chief two galleys Sable and in base a rose Gules barbed and seeded Proper. Supporters Dexter a stag reguardant; sinister a lion also reguardant; each charged on the shoulder with an acorn leaved and slipped all Proper. Motto Droit Et Avant

Academic offices
New creation	Chancellor of the University of Nottingham; 1949–1954	Succeeded by The Duke of Portland
Peerage of the United Kingdom
Preceded by Jesse Boot	Baron Trent; 1931–1956	Extinct
