= Boots Book-Lovers' Library =

Circulating library run by Boots the Chemist in the UK (1898–1966)

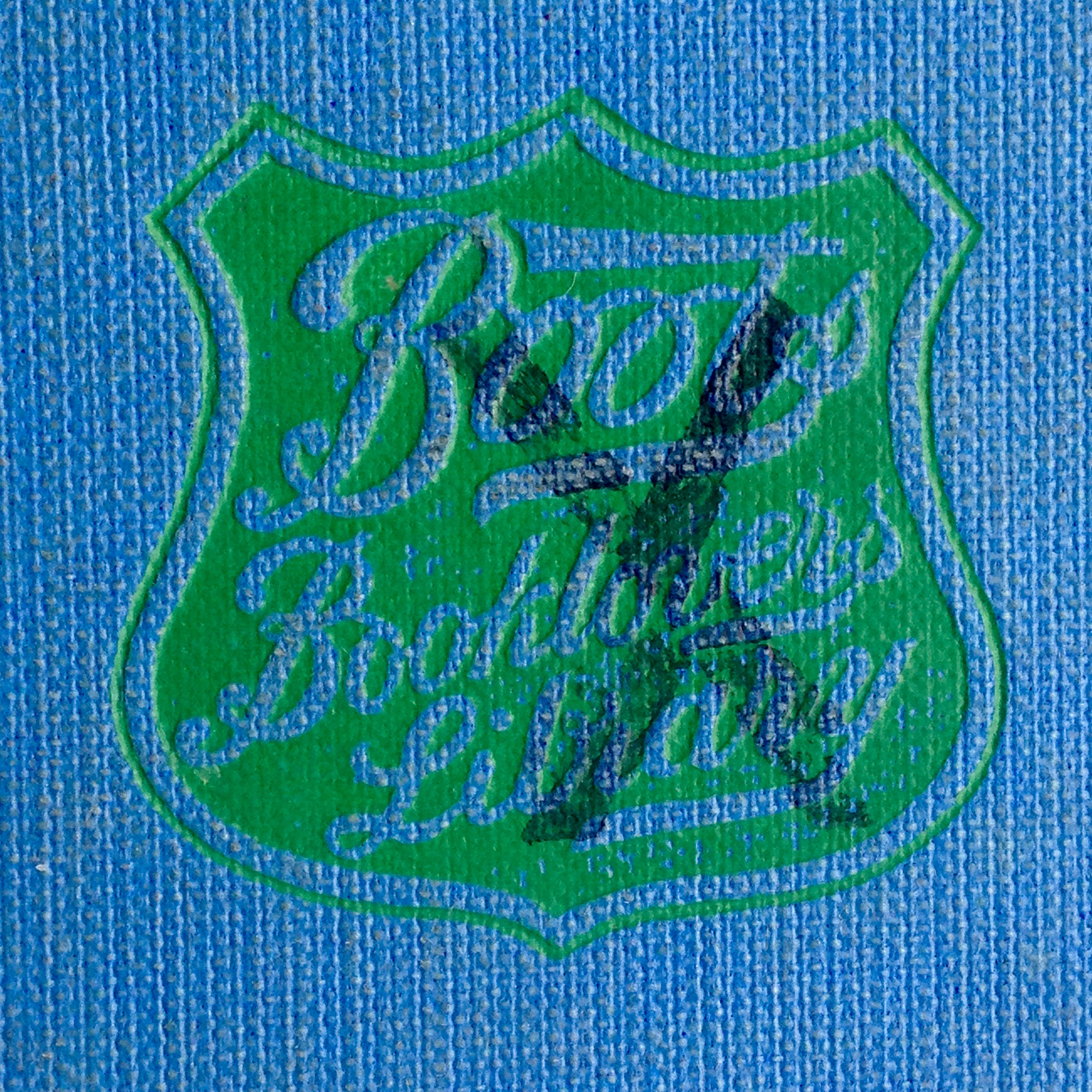
The green shield logo of Boots Booklovers Library with a cancellation mark (the black X). 'Booklovers' is spelled as a single word without an apostrophe, as is the word 'Boots'.

Boots Book-Lovers' Library was a circulating library run by Boots the Chemist, a chain of pharmacies in the United Kingdom. It began in 1898, at the instigation of Florence Boot (née Florence Annie Rowe), and closed in 1966, following the passage of the Public Libraries and Museums Act 1964, which required councils to provide free public libraries. Boot was married to Jesse Boot, the son of the founder of the company.

== Policies ==
The lending libraries were established within branches of Boots across the country, employing dedicated library staff whose training included examinations on both librarianship and literature. Boots' libraries displayed books for browsing on open shelves at a time when many public libraries had closed access. A catalogue of the books available was first published in 1904.

Subscriptions were available in Classes A and B, the latter being restricted to borrowing books at least one year old, as well as a premium 'On Demand' subscription.

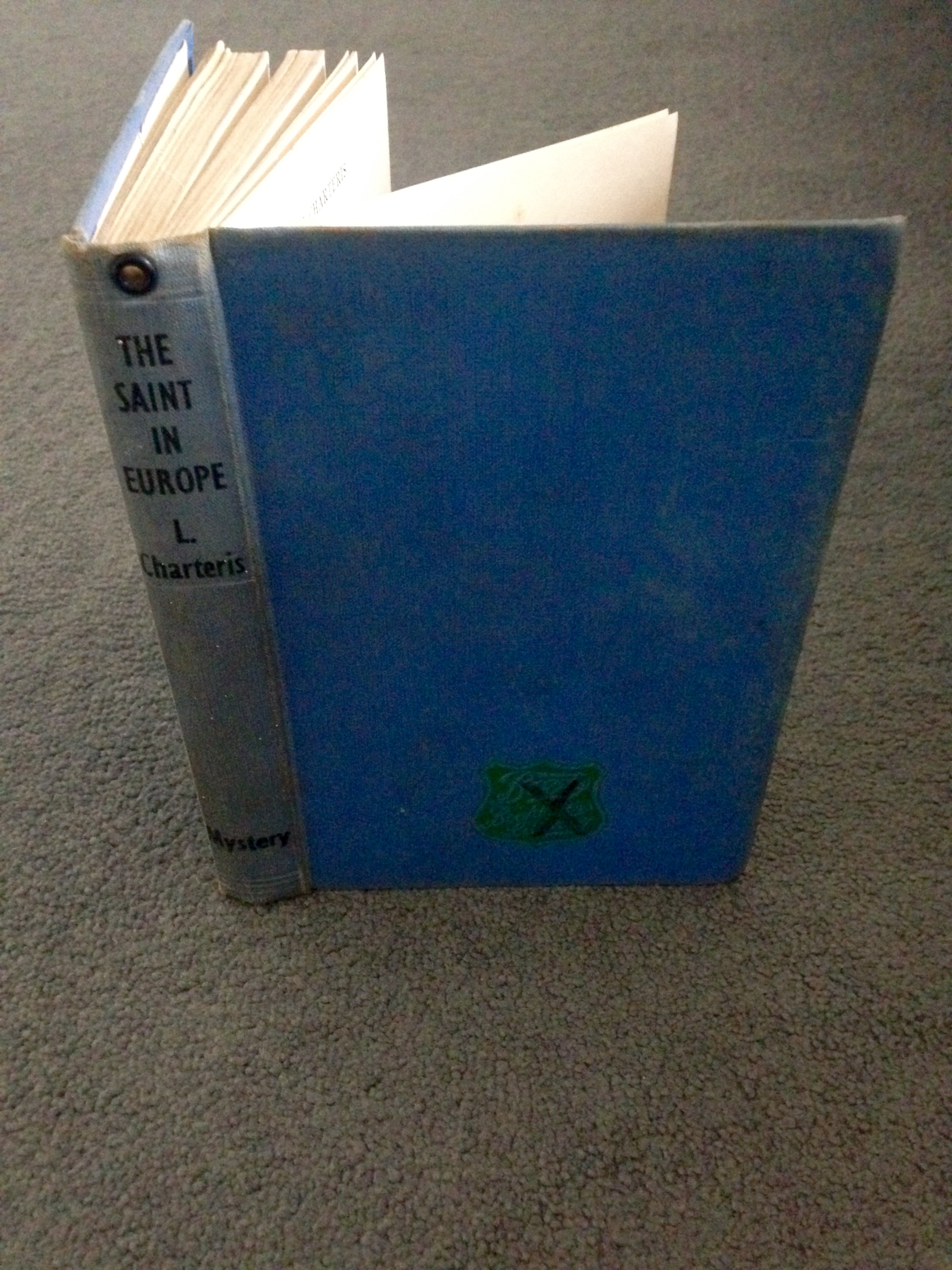
Boots Booklovers Library edition of The Saint in Europe

Books carried the 'green shield' logo on the front and an eyelet at the top of the spine. Membership tokens were rectangles of ivorine with a string similar to a Treasury tag; the string could be secured through the eyelet so that the token acted as a bookmark.

Boots also briefly reprinted classic books at the start of the 20th century under the imprint 'Pelham Library', named after the flagship Boots shop on Pelham Street in Nottingham, and later sold books as 'Boots the Booksellers'.

== In popular culture ==
John Betjeman places Boots' libraries at the head of an ironic list of British national emblems:

Think of what our Nation stands for,
Books from Boots' and country lanes,
Free speech, free passes, class distinction,
Democracy and proper drains.

— 'In Westminster Abbey' (1940), John Betjeman

The stage directions for the opening scene of Sir Noël Coward's 1936 play Still Life show the protagonist Laura Jesson 'reading a Boots library book at which she occasionally smiles'. His 1919 play I'll Leave it to You contains a character who comments on another's intention to borrow a book from Boots: "Oh, you belong to Boots too, I did for years—there's something so fascinating in having those little ivory marker things with one's name on them, but, of course, I had to give it up when the crash came." . In the 1945 cinema adaptation Brief Encounter, Laura is seen visiting a branch of Boots to exchange her library book as part of her weekly routine. In the 1948 film Here Come the Huggetts, Jane Huggett is librarian of the Boots Lending Library. ‘The Booklover’s Library’ a 2024 novel by Madeline Martin centres around a protagonist who works in a Boots booklovers library.
