= Jesse Boot, 1st Baron Trent =

English businessmsn (1850–1931)

The Right Honourable The Lord Trent Kt
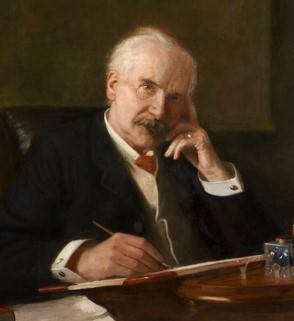
- Boot in 1909 by Noel Denholm Davis
- Born: 2 June 1850; Nottinghamshire, England
- Died: 13 June 1931 (aged 81); Jersey
- Spouse: Florence Anne Rowe
- Children: Dorothy Florence Boot; Margery Amy Boot; John Boot, 2nd Baron Trent
- Parent(s): John Boot (father); Mary Wills (mother)

Jesse Boot, 1st Baron Trent (2 June 1850 – 13 June 1931) transformed The Boots Company, founded by his father, John Boot, into a national retailer, which branded itself as "Chemists to the Nation".

== Biography ==
Jesse Boot sold his controlling interest to American investors in 1920. Boot offered his close friend and business associate John Harston, the opportunity of going into business with him, but Harston declined, feeling the venture was not worth investing in. Boot was a great benefactor to the City of Nottingham.

In 1920, Boot purchased, and presented to the City of Nottingham, 36 acres of open land that lay along the northern side of the Victoria Embankment alongside the River Trent, opposite Plaisaunce, Jesse Boot's summer house which was demolished in 1961.

Initially named the 'New Park', it was laid out with grass and trees, and provided a barrier against flooding as well as a pleasant walkway alongside the river. As part of the development an imposing war memorial gateway was built, with the aid of funds from Jesse Boot. He also donated land for the new University College at Highfields, now the University of Nottingham, which opened in 1928. and was presented with the Freedom of the City of Nottingham in 1920. He was also a significant benefactor to his wife's home, Jersey.

Boot was knighted in 1909, created a baronet in 1917, and announced in the New Year's Honours of 1929 was elevated to the peerage, and created Baron Trent, of Nottingham in the County of Nottingham on 18 March 1929.

These latter honours probably owed as much to his solid support of the Liberal Party as to his philanthropy to the city of his birth.

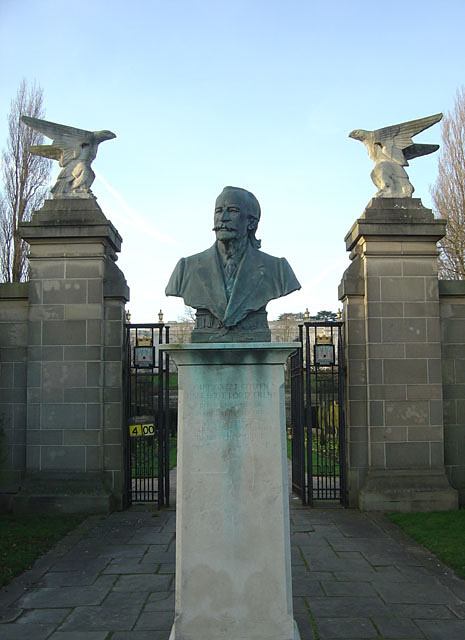
Memorial in Highfields Park

He died in Jersey in 1931. The Sir Jesse Boot Chair in Chemistry at the University of Nottingham was named in his honour. His widow commissioned the French glass artist René Lalique to refit the church of St Matthew, Millbrook (popularly known as the "Glass Church") as a memorial to him.

In 1935 a Primary school was built in Nottingham, Jesse Boot's home town. The School was titled The Jesse Boot Primary School and was located in Bakersfield, Nottingham. The School closed in 2009 after becoming an academy school. There is a pub named after him in the nearby Nottinghamshire town of Beeston, around 1 mile from Highfields Park.

His portrait, by Noel Denholm Davis, is in the collection of the University of Nottingham. Another, by the same artist, is on loan to the National Portrait Gallery.

== Bibliography ==
- Bradley, Ian Campbell. Enlightened Entrepreneurs (Weidenfeld & Nicolson, 1987). ISBN 978-0-297-79054-9
- Jesse Boot of Boots the Chemist: A study in Business History by Stanley Chapman (Detail from a copy of the book with black and white plates of Jesse Boot and published by Hodder and Stoughton UK as a special edition for The Boots Company Nottingham in 1973 with an ISBN 0-340-17704-7.)

== Arms ==
Coat of arms of Jesse Boot, 1st Baron Trent
| Crest A lion passant Proper ducally gorged and resting the dexter fore-paw on a burning lamp Or. Escutcheon Argent a chevron between in chief two galleys Sable and in base a rose Gules barbed and seeded Proper. Supporters Dexter a stag reguardant; sinister a lion also reguardant; each charged on the shoulder with an acorn leaved and slipped all Proper. Motto Droit Et Avant |

Peerage of the United Kingdom
| New creation | Baron Trent; 1929–1931 | Succeeded by John Campbell Boot |
Baronetage of the United Kingdom
| New creation | Baronet (of Nottingham); 1917–1931 | Succeeded by John Campbell Boot |
