= Boots (company) =

British multinational pharmacy store chain

Boots UK Limited
- Logo used since 2019
- Formerly: Boots the Chemists Limited (1968–2007)
- Type: Subsidiary
- Industry: Pharmaceuticals; Healthcare; Beauty; Photography
- Founded: 1849; 177 years ago
- Founder: John Boot
- Headquarters: Beeston, Nottinghamshire, England, United Kingdom
- Number of locations: c.2,000 UK (2025) c.1,912 international (2025)
- Area served: Directly-owned: United Kingdom; Ireland; Germany; The Netherlands; Mexico; Thailand; Franchise model: Norway; Bahrain; Kuwait; Oman; Qatar; Saudi Arabia; United Arab Emirates; Indonesia
- Key people: Anthony Hemmerdinger (president and Managing Director, Boots UK and Éire)
- Brands: No7; Natural Collection; Soap and Glory; Soltan
- Owner: Sycamore Partners; Stefano Pessina and family
- Number of employees: 66,400 UK and international (2025)
- Parent: The Boots Group
- Subsidiaries: Boots Opticians; Boots Hearingcare; Boots Ireland; Boots Thailand
- Website: boots.com

Boots UK Limited (formerly Boots the Chemists Limited) is a British health and beauty retailer and pharmacy chain that operates in the United Kingdom.

The Boots Company merged with Alliance UniChem in 2006 to form Alliance Boots. In 2007, Alliance Boots was bought by Kohlberg Kravis Roberts and Stefano Pessina, taking the company private, and moving its headquarters to Switzerland, making it the first-ever FTSE 100 company to be bought by a private equity firm. In 2012, Walgreens acquired a 45% stake in Alliance Boots, with the option to purchase the remaining shares within three years. It exercised this option in 2014, resulting in The Boots Company becoming a subsidiary of the newly formed Walgreens Boots Alliance on 31 December 2014. In 2025, Sycamore Partners completed the acquisition of Walgreens Boots Alliance, restructuring the group into five standalone businesses. Non-U.S. international operations were separated into The Boots Group, owned by Sycamore-managed investment funds, Stefano Pessina and his family and certain other investors.

The Boots Group currently has 3,912 shops around the world, 66,400 employees and annual sales of $23.6 billion. It owns shops in the UK, Ireland, Germany, Netherlands, Mexico and Thailand, holds retail investments in China, and operates a franchise model in the Middle East and Indonesia. The Boots name is also licensed for use in Norway with the shops being owned and operated by Cencora.

Boots is one of the largest retailers in the UK and Ireland, both in terms of revenue and the number of shops. As of December 2024, Boots has 2,000 stores across the United Kingdom and Ireland ranging from local pharmacies to large health and beauty shops. Its shops are primarily located on the high streets and in shopping centres. It sells many health and beauty products, and also provides optician and hearing care services within shops and as standalone practices. Boots also operates a retail website and a loyalty card programme called the Boots Advantage Card.

== History ==
=== Early history ===
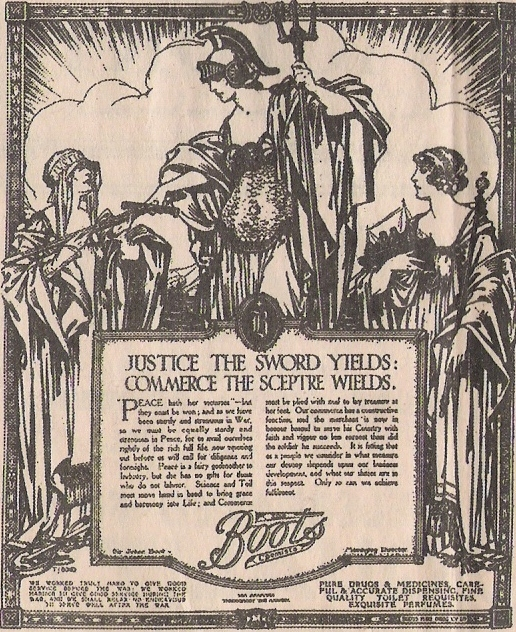
An advertisement for Boots from 1911

Boots was established in 1849, by John Boot. After his father's death in 1860, Jesse Boot, aged 10, helped his mother run the family's herbal medicine shop in Nottingham, which was incorporated as Boot and Co. Ltd in 1883, becoming Boots Pure Drug Company Ltd in 1888. In 1920, Jesse Boot sold the company to the American United Drug Company. However, because of deteriorating economic circumstances in North America, Boots was sold back into British hands in 1933. The grandson of the founder, John Boot, who inherited the title Baron Trent from his father, headed the company. The Boots Pure Drug Company name was changed to The Boots Company Limited in 1971.

Between 1898 and 1966, many branches of Boots incorporated a lending library department, known as Boots Book-Lovers' Library.

Logo used from the mid-1960s to 2019

Boots diversified into the research and manufacturing of drugs with its development of the Ibuprofen painkiller during the 1960s, invented by John Nicholson and Stewart Adams. The company was awarded the Queen's Award For Technical Achievement for this in 1987. A major research focus of Boots in the 1980s, was the drug for congestive heart failure, Manoplax. The withdrawal from market of Manoplax due to safety concerns in 1993, caused major pressure from investors, and in 1994, Boots divested its prescription drugs division, which had become no longer viable, to BASF. In 2006, it sold the Nurofen brand to Reckitt Benckiser.

In 1968, Boots acquired the 622-strong Timothy Whites and Taylors Ltd chain. Boots expanded into Canada by purchasing the Tamblyn Drugs chain from Loblaw Companies in 1979; this operation was sold to different Canadian owners in the late 1980s, rebranding as Pharma Plus and later as Rexall.

=== Expansion in the 1980s and beyond ===
In 1982, the company opened a new manufacturing plant in Cramlington, Northumberland. In the early 1990s, Boots began to diversify and bought Halfords, the bicycle and car parts business in 1991. The company offered numerous private label products, e.g., offering the PT400 typewriter, a rebadged Silverette model by Silver Seiko of Japan. It also developed the Children's World business of larger out of town superstores in the 1980s, but sold this chain to Mothercare in 1996. Halfords was sold in 2002. Boots Opticians was formed in 1987, with the acquisition of Clement Clarke and Curry and Paxton. Boots Opticians became the UK's second-largest retail optics chain. In 2009, Boots Opticians acquired Dollond & Aitchison.

Boots diversified into dentistry in 1998, with a number of shops offering this service. Boots sold the Do It All DIY chain to Focus DIY in 1998. Boots also made a venture into "Wellbeing" services offering customers treatments ranging from facials, homoeopathy, and nutritional advice to laser eye surgery and Botox but these services were abandoned in 2003, despite a launch that included a dedicated Freeview and Sky TV channel of the same name, and even redirecting web traffic from boots.com to wellbeing.com.

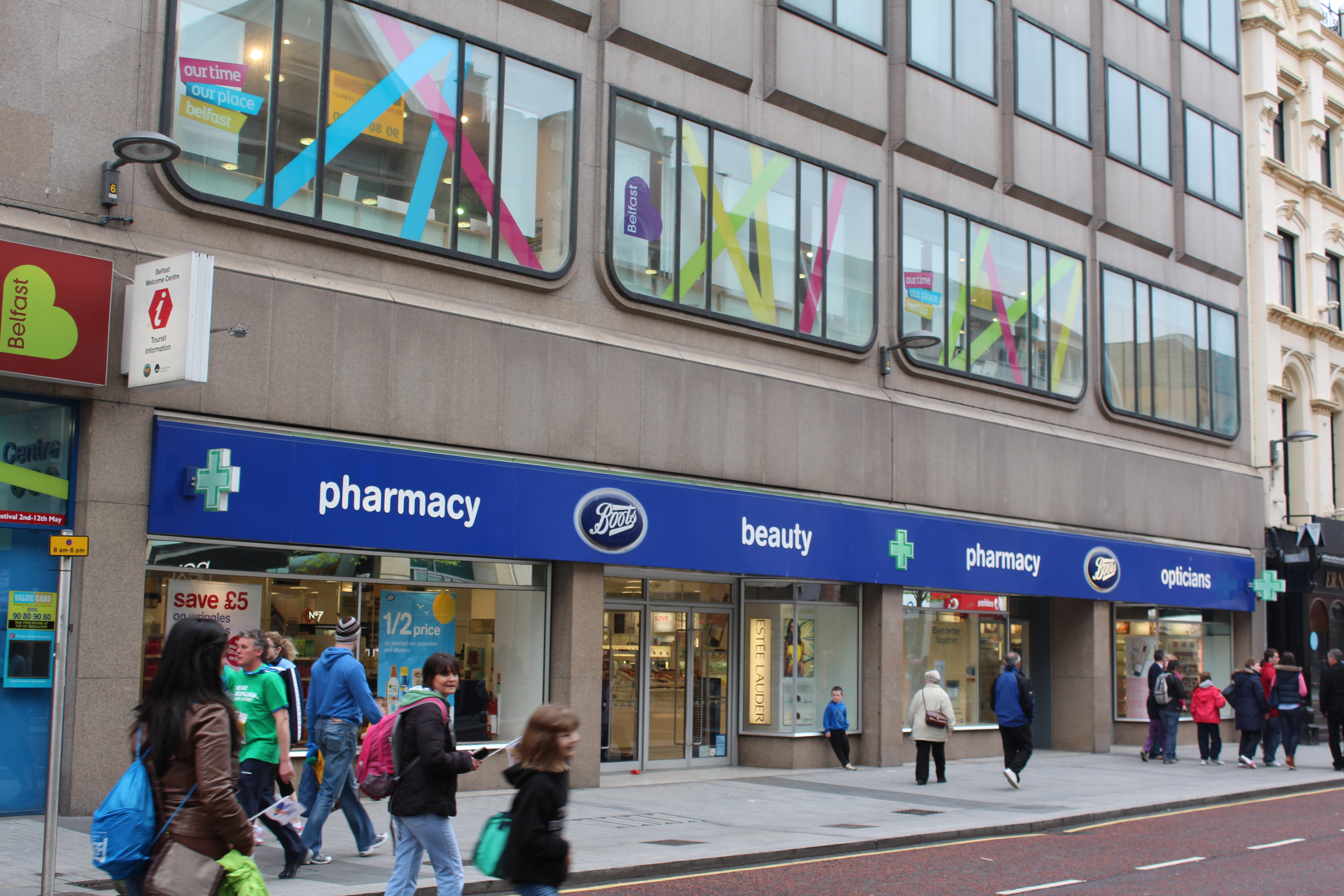
Boots branch in Belfast, Northern Ireland, 2013

In late 2004, Boots sold its laser eye surgery business to Optical Express.

=== Alliance Boots ===
In October 2005, a merger with Alliance UniChem was announced by the then chairman, Sir Nigel Rudd. The CEO Richard Baker left, and the new group became Alliance Boots plc. The merger became effective on 31 July 2006.

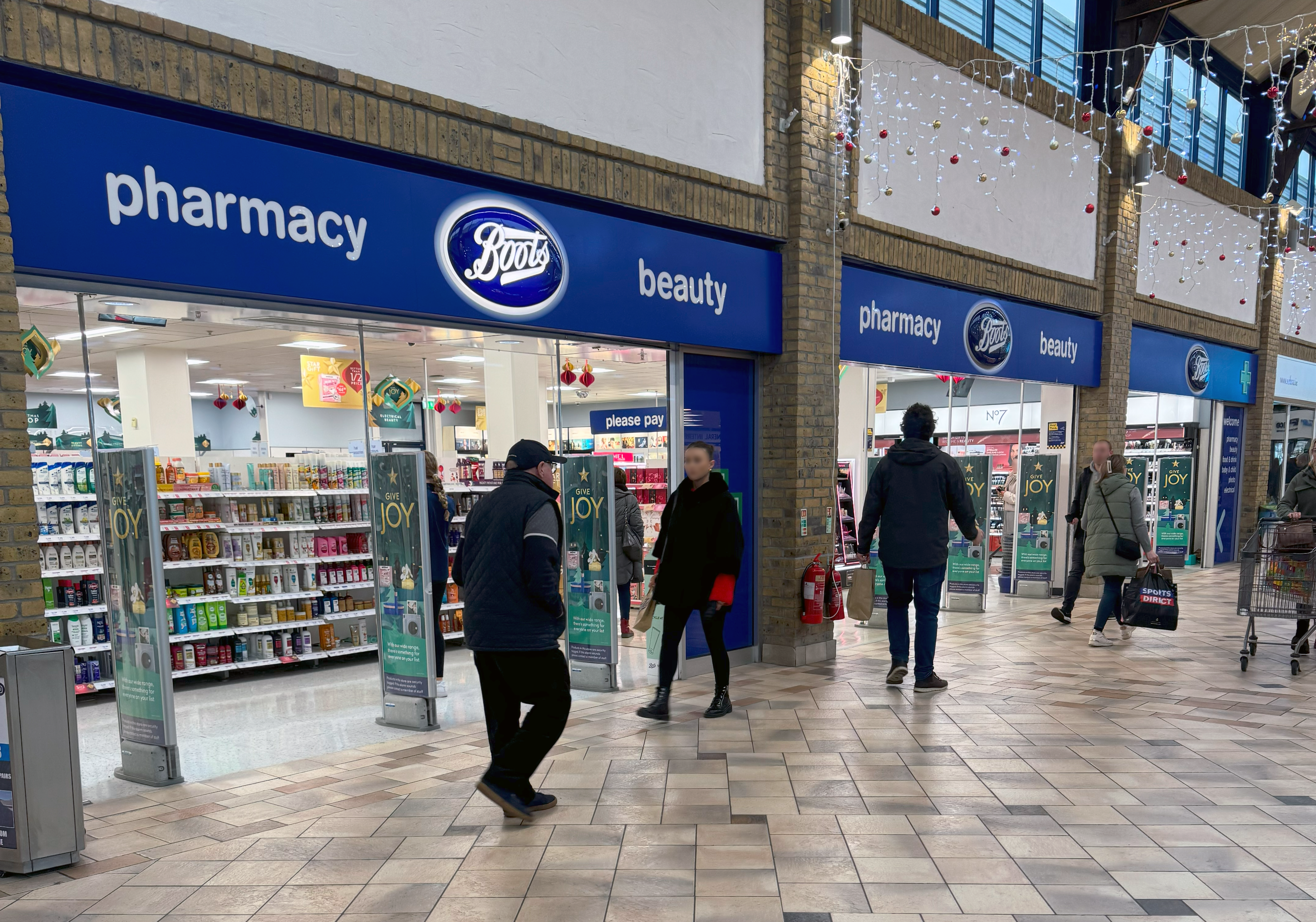
Boots branch in Mullingar, Ireland, 2023

Alliance Boots was purchased by Kohlberg Kravis Roberts and Stefano Pessina, the deputy chairman of the company, in April 2007 for £11.1 billion, taking the company private and beating a rival bid from Guy Hands's Terra Firma Capital Partners. This was the first ever instance of a FTSE 100 company having been bought by a private equity firm. In June 2008, the group headquarters were moved to Zug, Switzerland. According to John Ralfe, Boots' former head of corporate finance, "the UK has lost about £100m a year in tax as result".

'Boots the Chemists Limited' was re-registered under the name 'Boots UK Limited' on 1 October 2007. Management of all staff was moved to Boots Management Services Limited on 1 July 2010.

=== No. 7 Protect & Perfect Intense Beauty Serum ===
In 2007, Professor Chris Griffiths' University of Manchester team found the Serum, formerly, No. 7 Refine & Rewind Beauty Serum stimulated the production of fibrillin-1 and appeared to smooth out wrinkles, (published in the British Journal of Dermatology). In 2007, an independent investigation by the BBC's Horizon programme caused a run on a product in the same product range after it was found to be the only one to have a beneficial effect. Richard Weller, an Edinburgh University dermatologist, said it was unlikely to be as effective as prescription retinoids.

=== Sale of homeopathic products ===
In 2009, Boots Superintendent Pharmacist Paul Bennett was interviewed by the House of Commons Science and Technology Committee about the company's sale of homeopathic medicines. He told the committee that the company had no evidence to suggest that homeopathic medicines are efficacious but Boots sold them anyway, for reasons of "consumer choice". The comments attracted media attention. In 2010, protesters staged a mass homeopathy "overdose" outside Boots shops.

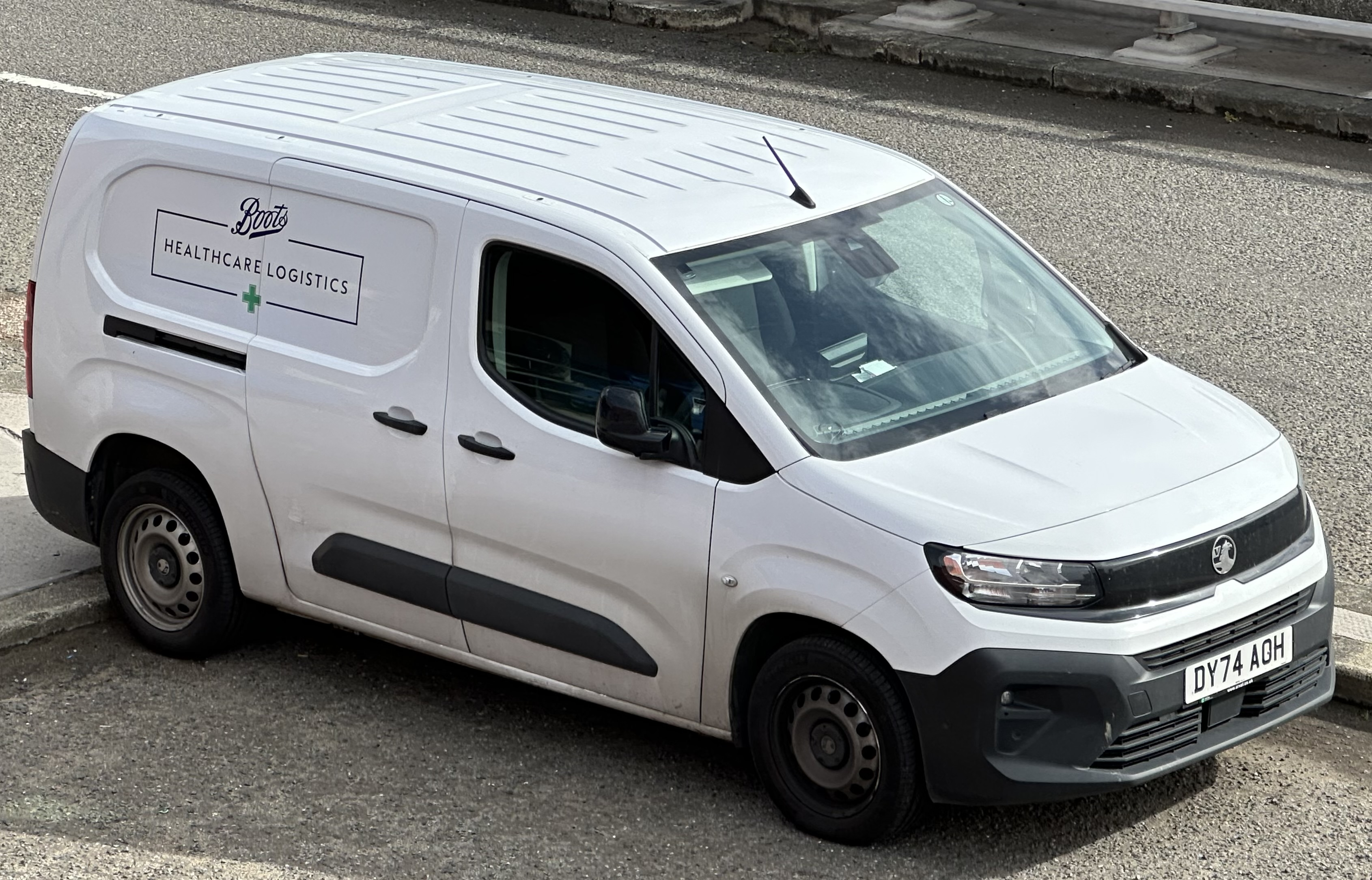
A Boots Healthcare Logistics delivery van parked at the Pentagon Shopping Centre in Chatham, Kent, England

=== Walgreens ===
In June 2012, it was announced that Walgreens, the United States' largest chemist chain, would purchase a 45% stake in Alliance Boots for US$6.7 billion. The deal was said to be a long-term plan to give maximum exposure to both brands, Boots more so in the US and, Walgreens more so in the UK and in China through Boots' presence in that market. The deal gave the option to complete a full merger of the organisations within three years costing an extra $9.5bn. Walgreens confirmed on 6 August 2014, that it would purchase the remaining 55% and merge with Alliance Boots to form a new holding company, Walgreens Boots Alliance Inc.

In August 2012, Boots began stocking convenience food products from Irish retailer Musgrave's SuperValu chain.

=== Charging the NHS for carrying out unnecessary medicine reviews ===
In April 2016, the Pharmacists' Defence Association stated that company managers were exploiting the NHS by insisting that each outlet carry out medicine use reviews, even if patients did not need them. The NHS paid £28 per review up to a maximum of 400 per shop per year.

=== 2016 reports of workplace pressure ===
At the same time as the article about medicine reviews, The Guardian published a longer report on the same day called 'How Boots went Rogue', which told the story from the eyes of a Boots pharmacist talking about working conditions at the company. It also covered the buyout of the company and the owners' financial approach. Four days later it published an article with emails from some pharmacists who had written about how "the chain allegedly compels staff to compromise ethics for targets". The article said "The letters editor believes this may be the largest haul of mail he has ever received about a single article. Others rang in."

There were two further follow-up articles in the days following. The Guardian subsequently noted a letter purporting to be from an "independent pharmacist" criticising its stance on the issue which it identified as having been edited and amended by one of the firm's vice-presidents. The letter was emailed as a Word document and contained tracked changes.

Following the Guardian reports, Boots announced the departure of UK operations director, Simon Roberts, in June 2016.

=== Supply of the "morning after pill" ===
In July 2017, the British Pregnancy Advisory Service (BPAS) revealed that Boots was selling emergency contraceptive medication at four times the cost price and had refused requests to join rival pharmacy retail chains, including Superdrug and Tesco, which had agreed to cease profiting financially in this way. In a written response to BPAS, Boots revealed that they were frequently contacted by individuals who disapproved of the dispensing of such medication, which might be viewed as "incentivising inappropriate use", an assertion which campaigners described as "insulting and sexist".

BPAS called on the public to boycott the company and email them requesting that they reverse the policy. Following the boycott's launch, lawyers representing Boots alleged that the online complaint form created by BPAS had resulted in a "torrent of abuse" to five of Boots' senior managers and that BPAS had facilitated and tacitly encouraged harassment by naming individual staff members on the form. In response, BPAS stated that Boots had "failed to provide any evidence of abuse sent through the campaign". In November 2017, more than 130 Labour politicians signed a letter criticising Boots' failure to fulfil its promise to stock a low-cost alternative in its shops by October. At the end of January 2018, Boots confirmed that it was now offering the cheaper medication in all of its pharmacies.

Throughout the media coverage, a May–July 2017, pricelist from its wholesaler and sister company Alliance Healthcare stated that the "Normal Retail Price inc. VAT" of Levonelle One Step was £12.72.

=== Pharmacist suicide ===
On 25 October 2017, a debate was held in the House of Commons about pharmacists' mental health and the support that employers give to employees. Much of the discussion concerned the suicide of a Boots pharmacist, Alison Stamps, in May 2015, and Boots' response was criticised. Part of a letter from Alison Stamps' parents was read out by MP Kevan Jones, which said: "It is clear that Alison was a victim of corporate greed and collateral damage by an uncaring company intent only on its own agenda."

=== BBC documentary and press coverage in 2018 ===
On 8 January 2018, the BBC broadcast an Inside Out documentary called "Boots: Pharmacists under Pressure?" about the deaths of three patients following dispensing errors. It also featured accounts from three whistleblowers, who alleged that there were staffing issues at the company. One of the whistleblowers, who had formerly worked in a patient safety role, stated that Boots had calculated that in excess of £100m additional investment in staffing was required each year in its pharmacies and to meet the company's expectations of its staff. The BBC also published two articles on the same day. A separate article almost three weeks later told the story of a patient who was given the wrong medicine in December 2017 by a "frazzled" pharmacist. The patient said there was clearly a staffing problem.

Boots had told the BBC documentary makers that there had been no further patient deaths associated with dispensing errors since 2015. However, in July 2018, it was reported that an error had occurred in 2016 in which two lots of the same medicines were dispensed and supplied to the same patient, Richard Lee, who subsequently died. The error was found at a coroner's inquest to have contributed to his death.

=== Overcharging the NHS for products ===
In February 2018, Boots was criticised for charging excessive prices for low-value products supplied to the NHS: in one case, it was found that the pharmacy was billing in excess of £1,500 for a moisturiser which normally retailed at less than £2. In May 2018, a further investigation by The Times found that on at least five occasions between 2013 and 2017, Boots had charged over £3,200 for a medicinal mouthwash used to treat mouth ulcers in chemotherapy patients, in comparison to an independent supplier which had charged the equivalent of £93 for the same product. The investigation found that Boots had ordered the product from Alliance Healthcare, a supplier owned by Boots' parent company. In response, a spokesman for Walgreens Boots Alliance rejected accusations of overcharging the NHS and said that the bespoke nature of the orders, often requested at short notice, results in the high cost.

=== Sponsorship deal ===
In April 2019, Boots announced it would sponsor the England, Scotland, Wales, Northern Ireland and Republic of Ireland women's football teams in a multi-million pound/euro deal. The deal was to last three years and cover the 2019 FIFA Women's World Cup and the UEFA Women's Euro 2021 competitions.

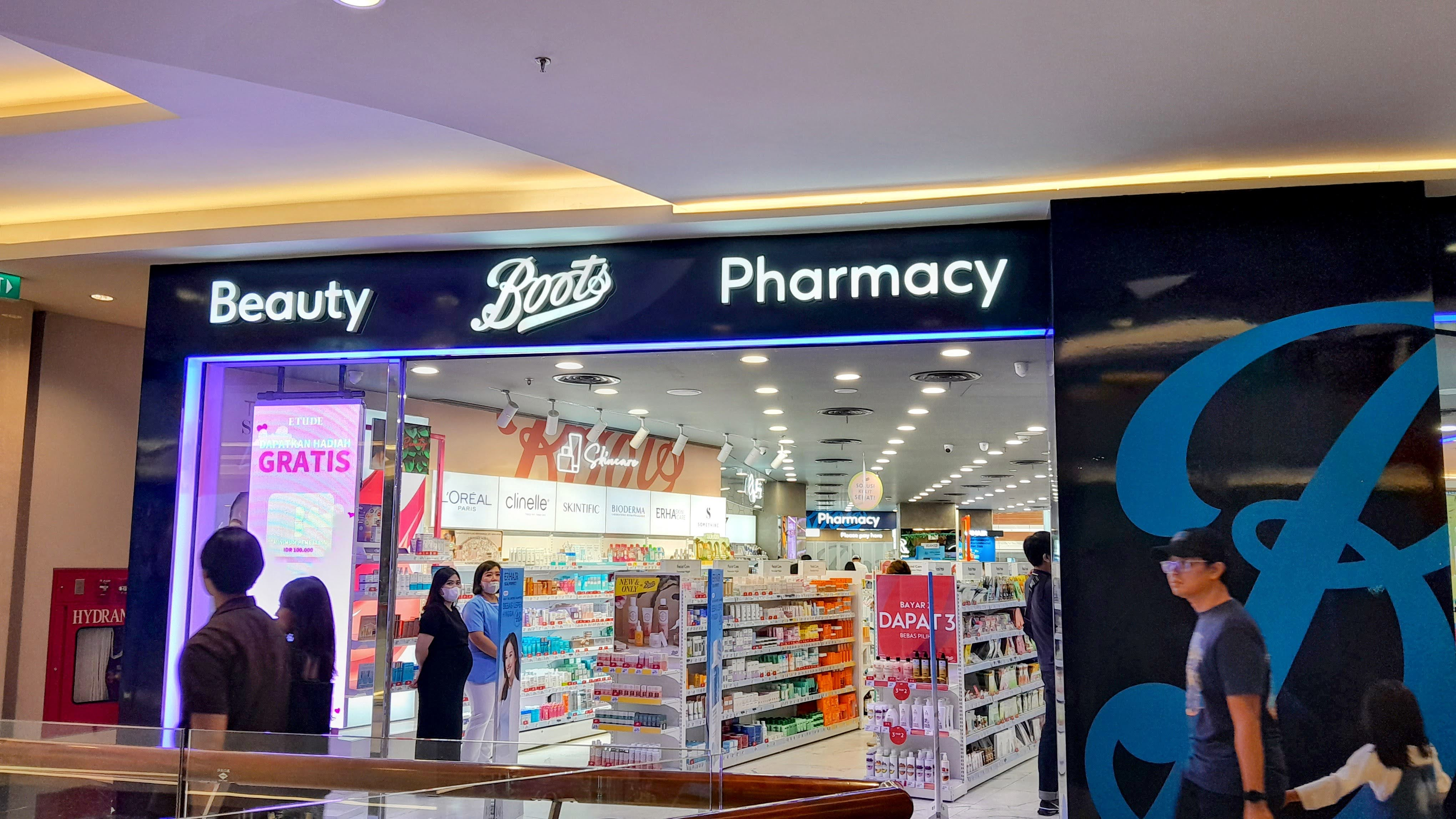
Boots branch at Pondok Indah Mall in Jakarta, 2023

=== Rationalisation ===
In May 2019, Boots announced that it was closing 200+ underperforming shops. Then, in July 2020, the group announced that it would be cutting 4,000 jobs and shutting 48 optician stores in the UK.

In November 2024, Anthony Hemmerdinger was appointed the new Managing Director of both the UK and Ireland. In December 2024, it was reported that Sycamore Partners were lined up to acquire Walgreens Boots Alliance in early 2025.

=== New ownership ===
Following the completion of Sycamore Partners acquisition of Walgreens Boots Alliance in August 2025, ownership of the company transferred to The Boots Group, a UK-headquartered private company comprising Boots UK & Ireland, Boots Opticians, No7 Beauty Company, Alliance Healthcare Germany, Farmacias Benavides in Mexico, retail pharmacies in Thailand, retail investments in China, and international franchise operations in the Middle East and Indonesia. The Boots Group is owned by Sycamore Partners and Stefano Pessina and his family.

In May 2026, Boots announced the appointment of Alex Baldock as its next chief executive officer, effective in late 2026. The appointment coincided with company preparations for a potential initial public offering (IPO). In October 2026 it was announced in the press that the Weston family's Wittington Investments, the parent company of the aforementioned Loblaw, had started negotiations to purchase the company from Sycamore Partners for £7 billion – the sale was agreed on 7 October at £6.7 billion, with the deal expected to complete in early 2027. Its operations in Mexico and Germany are not included in the sale, allowing the company to exclusively focus on the Boots and No7 businesses.

== Products and services ==
Boots sell the following products and services:

- Prescription medicines sold via their pharmacies
- Retail (non-prescription) medicines
- Wide range of health and beauty products including related electrical products (hairdryers, shavers, electric toothbrushes)
- Photography – Boots is an established provider of photography services. Traditionally the shops offered photographic processing services, but with the shift from film to digital photography, the shops now include kiosk printing services.
- Clothing – baby and toddler ranges and maternity wear.
- Food and drink (branded as Boots Delicious) – most branches sell lunchtime food and drink products which are available as part of a "Meal Deal" promotion.
- Opticians
- Hearing care
- Mental health – in 2022, Boots launched Depression & Anxiety Treatment on their Online Doctor service which offers treatments for depression and anxiety for £65 per month. This includes a GP consultation and access to medicines. There is also a "SupportRoom" offering psychological support by text message or video for £40 per month and a "symptom checker" questionnaire for patients, which is reviewed by a mental health professional.

== International operations ==
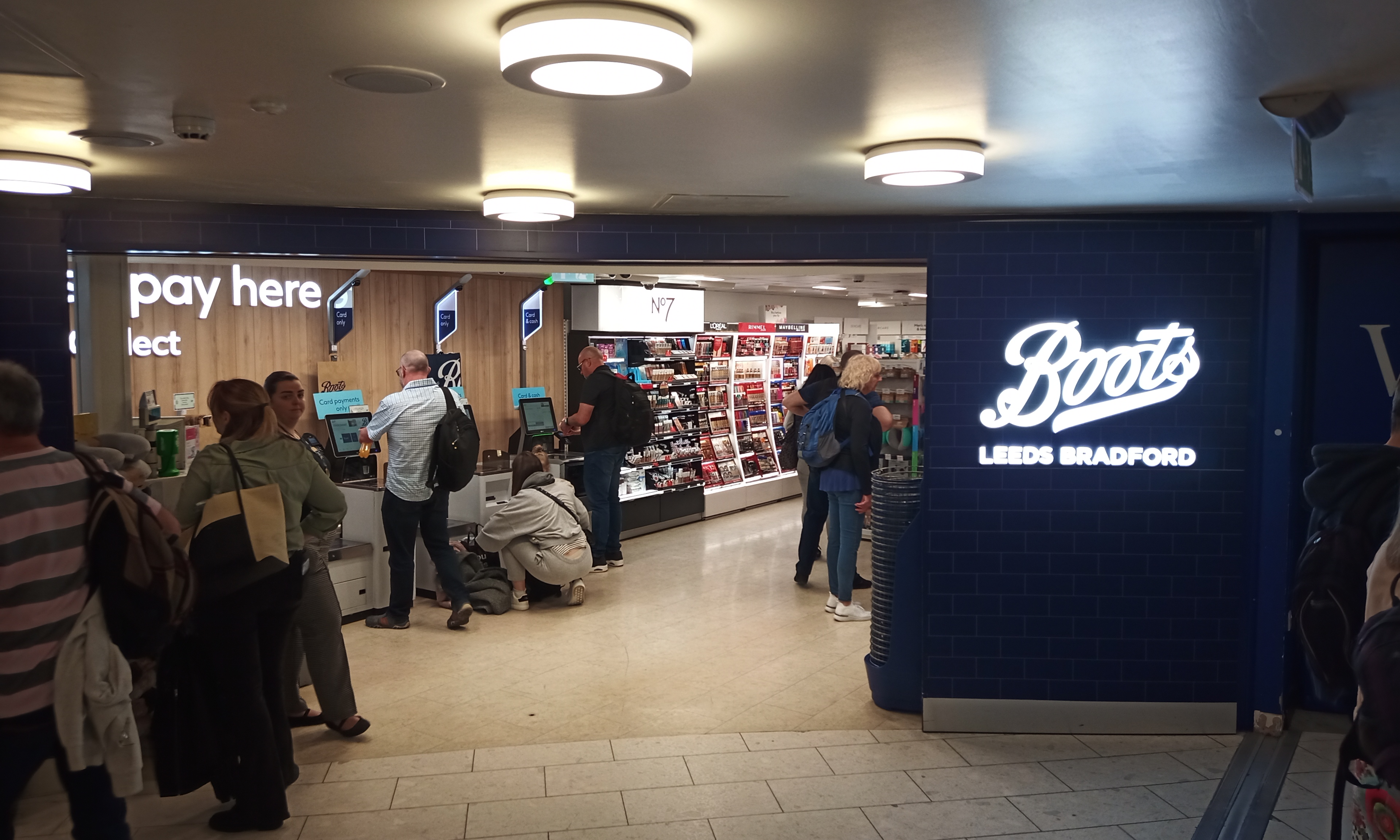
Boots at Leeds Bradford Airport, 2025

As of 2025, the parent company, The Boots Group has 3,912 shops around the world, 66,400 employees and annual sales of $23.6 billion. It owns shops in the UK, Ireland, Germany, The Netherlands, Mexico and Thailand.

The Alshaya Group, a franchise operator based in Kuwait, operates a number of Boots-branded stores throughout the Middle East, including in Bahrain, Kuwait, Oman, Qatar, Saudi Arabia and the United Arab Emirates, while Boots-branded stores throughout Indonesia are operated by PT Mitra Adiperkasa Tbk and Boots-branded stores across Norway are owned and operated by Cencora.

== The Boots Factory Site ==
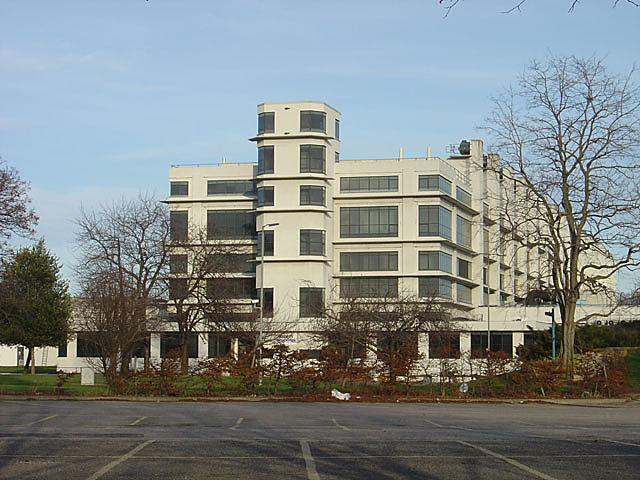
D6 building in Beeston

The Boots Factory Site, near the Nottingham suburb of Beeston, features a number of listed buildings. This includes the two principal factory buildings, D6 and D10, designed by Sir Owen Williams and built in 1932, and 1935–1938, respectively. Both are Grade I listed. The former fire station of 1938, D34, is also by Williams and is Grade II listed. The headquarters office building known as D90 is Grade II* and was built to designs by Skidmore, Owings & Merrill in 1966–68.

== See also ==
- Pharmaceutical industry in the United Kingdom
