= John Boot =

British chemist and businessman

- Born: October 1815; Radcliffe-on-Trent, England
- Died: 30 May 1860 (aged 44); Nottingham, England
- Occupations: Chemist, businessperson
- Years active: 1849–1860
- Known for: Founding Boots the Chemists
- Spouses: Elizabeth Mills (m. 1838; died 1848) Mary Wills (m. 1849)
- Children: Jesse Boot, 1st Baron Trent
- Family: John Boot, 2nd Baron Trent (grandson)

John Boot (October 1815 – 30 May 1860) was an English chemist and retail businessperson who was the sole founder of Boots the Chemists. Originally working in agriculture, he was forced by ill health to change careers and set up a shop to sell medicinal herbal remedies at Goose Gate, Nottingham. Although he had no formal qualification, he had learned the skills from his mother and from the Methodist book, Primitive Physic by John Wesley.

When Boot died in 1860, his wife Mary took over the business, and his son, Jesse, went on to expand the business by opening more stores in poor areas, eventually expanding it into the company Boots UK.

== Biography ==
=== Early life ===
Boot was born in Radcliffe-on-Trent, England, in October 1815. He was the son of William Boot; his mother Sarah (née Fox) had practised the duty of herbal management; John was inspired by this.

=== Founding Boots ===
Originally a farm worker, he was forced to change career due to poor health. He set up a shop at Goose Gate, Nottingham, to sell medicinal herbal remedies, and called it "British and American Botanic Establishment".

In the store, he offered remedies and consultations to members of the public three days a week, in a poor area of Nottingham. The career had also appealed to Boot due to his Methodist roots, where he had studied the books of John Wesley, including Primitive Physic, a book about the fundamentals of herbal biology and remedies.

=== Personal life and death ===
Boot married Elizabeth Mills in 1838; she died in 1848. He married his second wife Mary Wills, in 1849, and the couple had one child, Jesse, on 2 June 1850.

Boot died on 30 May 1860, leaving his wife and business behind. Mary Boot carried on with the business, renaming it as M & J Boot, Herbalists. Boot's son, Jesse, would help bring the business to a much larger custom base, by opening further shops in other poor areas of the city, and eventually evolving into the national Boots UK empire.
