= Cost price =

Value representing unit price

In retail systems, the cost price represents the specific inventory value that represents unit price purchased. This value is used as a key factor in determining profitability. In some stock market theories it is used in establishing the value of stock holding.

== Forms ==
Cost prices appear in several forms, such as actual cost, last cost, average cost, and net realizable value.

=== Cost price ===
Cost price is also known as CP. cost price is the original price of an item. The cost is the total outlay required to produce a product or carry out a service. Cost price is used in establishing profitability in the following ways:

- Selling price (excluding tax) less cost results in the profit in money terms.
- Profit / selling price (excluding tax) when expressed as a percentage produces (gross profit) or GP%.
- Expense / net sales yields a percentage that when used as the target margin will produce gross profit.

=== Actual or landed cost ===
In calculating actual or landed cost, all expenses incurred in acquiring an item are added to the cost of items in order to establish what the goods actually cost. Additions usually include freight, insurance costs, import duties and other charges which arise between manufacturer and retailer.

=== Last cost ===
This is the actual value of the item when last purchased, normally expressed in units.

=== Average cost ===
When new stock is combined with old stock, the new price often overstates the value of stock holding. The better method is to combine the total value of investment in stock, old and new, and divide by the total number of units to calculate the average cost. This is a very accurate method of establishing stock holding.

==== Moving average cost ====
Moving average cost (MAC) is a slight permutation of the above, with the average being calculated from the previous average and new price.

=== Net realizable value ===
The net realizable value normally indicates the average value of an item in the marketplace. Often this cost is interchangeable with replacement cost.

== Bibliography ==
- Kurt Tecklenburg: Die Selbstkosten des Eisenbahnbetriebes. In: ZVDE, 61, 7. April 1921, S. 260
- Otto Schulz-Mehrin: Vereinfachte Selbstkosten- und Preisberechnung zur Berücksichtigung der Geldentwertung. In: Maschinenbau/Wirtschaft, Heft 24, 15. September 1923, S. 975 ff.
- Eugen Schmalenbach: Grundlagen der Selbstkostenrechnung und Preispolitik. 1925, S. 52
- Hans Müller-Bernhardt: Industrielle Selbstkosten bei schwankendem Beschäftigungsgrad. 1925
- Klaus Rumer: Erfolgsstrategien für mittelständische Unternehmen im internationalen Wettbewerb. 1998, S. 56
- Günter Wöhe: Einführung in die Allgemeine Betriebswirtschaftslehre. 25. Auflage. 2010, S. 920
- Josef Kloock: Selbstkosten. In: Wolfgang Lück: Lexikon der Betriebswirtschaft. 1990, S. 1034
- Harry Zingel: Lehrbuch der Kosten- und Leistungsrechnung. 2004, S. 69
- Wolfgang Hilke: Bilanzpolitik. 1991, S. 115 f.
- Bundesgerichtshof, Urteil vom 14.07.1965 - "Einführungsangebot", Ib ZR 81/63
- Bundesgerichtshof, Urteil vom 08.01.1960 - "Schleuderpreise", I ZR 7/59
- Bundesgerichtshof, Urteil vom 31.01.1979 - "Verkauf unter Einstandspreis I", I ZR 21/77
