= Gregory Wasson =

American businessman

- Born: Gregory David Wasson; October 19, 1958 (age 67); Lafayette, Indiana, US
- Education: Twin Lakes High School, Monticello, Indiana
- Alma mater: Purdue University
- Occupations: Co-founder and president of Wasson Enterprise; Former president and CEO of Walgreens; Director of Verizon Communications; Director of PNC Financial Services Group; Director of Health Care Service Corporation
- Successor: Stefano Pessina
- Website: http://www.wassonenterprise.com

Gregory David Wasson (born October 19, 1958) is an American businessman. He is the co-founder and president of Wasson Enterprise, a family-based investment office, the executive chairman of Innventure, co-founder of CoolerScreens, and the former president and chief executive officer (CEO) of Walgreens Boots Alliance (NASDAQ:WBA).

Prior to the merge of Walgreens and Alliance Boots, Wasson was president and CEO of Walgreens, the US's largest retail community pharmacy chain from 2009 to 2014. Wasson is on the board of directors of Health Care Service Corporation (HCSC), The Economic Club of Chicago, Corporate Leadership Center, and the Museum of Science and Industry.

== Early life ==
Wasson was born October 19, 1958, in Lafayette, Indiana, to Richard and Phyllis Wasson. His family lived in Delphi until he was 13, and then moved to nearby Monticello, Indiana. Wasson graduated from Twin Lakes High School. Wasson studied pharmacy at Purdue University and met his future wife there. They married on their graduation day in 1981.

== Career ==
=== Walgreens ===
Wasson joined Walgreens as a pharmacy intern in 1980. Three days after graduating from college, he relocated to Houston as a management trainee. He was managing his first store four months later. He was promoted to district manager in Milwaukee in 1986, with 30 store managers reporting to him. Wasson was promoted to a regional vice president of the store operations division in 1999.

He was promoted to district manager in Milwaukee in 1986, with 30 store managers reporting to him.

Wasson was promoted to a regional vice president of the store operations division in 1999. In 2001, he was promoted again to Walgreens vice president and made an executive vice president of Walgreens Health Initiatives, the company's pharmacy benefit manager (PBM). Wasson was promoted to president of Walgreens Health Initiatives in 2002, Walgreens senior vice president in 2004 and to a Walgreens executive vice president in 2005. In 2007, he was named president and chief operating officer of Walgreens, succeeding Jeff Rein. In 2009, he was named CEO.

In 2007, he was named president and chief operating officer of Walgreens, succeeding Jeff Rein. In 2009, he was named CEO.

In 2012, Walgreens and Alliance Boots entered into a strategic transaction to create the first global pharmacy-led, health and wellbeing enterprise. After two years, on December 31, 2014, Walgreens completed the global merger with Alliance Boots —a pharmacy-led health and beauty group across Europe with a presence in more than 25 countries. After the close of the second step of the Alliance Boots transaction, Wasson retired from Walgreens after a 35-year career with the company.

=== Wasson Enterprise ===
In 2016, Greg and his wife Kim Wasson founded Wasson Enterprise, an investment firm whose goal is to commercialize sustainable businesses. Wasson Enterprise's first partnership was with Innventure, which seeks to commercialize disruptive technology for multinational organizations. Wasson is also the co-founder of CoolerScreens, an in-store digital marketing and merchandising platform.

=== Appointments ===
In addition to his role at Wasson Enterprise, Wasson was on the board of directors of several companies. He sat on the board of Verizon Communications from March 2013 through October 2018, and was on the board of PNC Financial Services Group from July 2015 through October 2018. He has also been a director of Health Care Service Corporation (HCSC), the largest customer-owned health insurance company, since November 2015. Wasson has been a director of AmerisourceBergen Corporation, a global pharmaceutical sourcing and distribution services, with which Walgreens has a long-term strategic partnership, and a directorsof Alliance Boots GmbH.

Wasson has been a director of AmerisourceBergen Corporation, a global pharmaceutical sourcing and distribution services, with which Walgreens has a long-term strategic partnership, and a directorsof Alliance Boots GmbH.

Past roles include chairman of National Association of Chain Drug Stores (NACDS) the vice chairman of Retail Industry Leaders Association (RILA), member of the Healthcare Leadership Council (HLC), The Wall Street Journal CEO Council, and the civic committee of the Commercial Club of Chicago, as well as being a member of the British-American Business Council International Advisory Board. He served many years as a board member of Consumer Goods Forum (CGF), The Field Museum, and the Midtown Educational Foundation and a member of the Illinois chapter of the American Cancer Society's CEOs Against Cancer. Wasson is on the trustee board of the Chicago Museum of Science and Industry (MSI) and is a member of The Business Council, Corporate Leadership Center, The Economic Club of Chicago, The Commercial Club of Chicago and Chicago Club.

Wasson is on the trustee board of the Chicago Museum of Science and Industry (MSI) and is a member of The Business Council, Corporate Leadership Center, The Economic Club of Chicago, The Commercial Club of Chicago and Chicago Club.

In 2015, Wasson received the Sheldon W. Fantle Lifetime Achievement Award from National Association of Chain Drug Stores’ (NACDS) and the Grocery Manufacturers Association (GMA) gave Wasson the GMA Hall of Achievement Award. In 2016, he received two awards from Purdue University, the Distinguished Alumni Award, and the Career Achievement Award.

== SEC charges ==
In 2018, the SEC charged Wasson, Walgreens, and former Walgreens CFO Wade Miquelon for misleading investors during Greg's time at the company. While neither admitting nor denying the findings, Wasson agreed to pay a fine of $160,000. Walgreens agreed to pay $34.5 million, while Miquelon also paid a $160,000 penalty. Within a week of the agreement, Wasson resigned his board positions with Verizon Communications and PNC Financial Services Group.

== Personal life ==
Wasson married Kimberly "Kim" Wasson (née Munt) on May 16, 1981, and they have two daughters. He and his family attend Long Grove Community Church, where his wife Kim previously was the compassion/outreach ministry leader.
