= Sahuaro High School =

Location
- 545 North Camino Seco; Tucson, Arizona 85710; United States; 32°13′31″N 110°48′27″W

Information
- Type: Public secondary
- Motto: "It's a Matter of Pride"
- Established: September 3, 1968 (58 years ago)
- School board: Tucson Unified School District
- CEEB code: 030504
- Principal: Roberto Estrella
- Teaching staff: 72.60 (FTE)
- Grades: 9–12
- Enrollment: 1,386 (2023-2024)
- Student to teacher ratio: 19.09
- Campus type: Urban
- Colors: Cardinal and navy
- Mascot: Cougars
- Yearbook: Viva!
- Website: sahuarohs.tusd1.org

Sahuaro High School is a public high school located in Tucson, Arizona, United States, part of the Tucson Unified School District. It is located on the far east side of the city at 545 North Camino Seco, just north of Vicksburg Street between Broadway and Speedway Boulevards. Contemporary establishments Sabino High School and Santa Rita High School have similar facilities. The school's mascot is the cougar, and its colors are scarlet and navy.

The school scored 87/83/23/81 on the AIMS (Arizona Instruments to Measure Standards) tests in Reading/Math/Science/Writing.

== History ==
In the 1960s, as it was being planned, the student population was increasing.

== Programs ==
- Advanced Placement courses in art history, calculus, English, government, United States history, music theory, psychology
- Biochemistry research
- Video production
- Speech
- Career and Technical Education
- AVID (Advancement Via Individual Determination)
- Construction technology
- Family and consumer sciences
- Cooperative office education
- Jazz band
- Life skills
- 4th R Partners-in-Education
- Distributive Education Clubs of America (DECA)
- Concert and cadet orchestras
- Award-winning student council
- Concert choir and vocal ensemble

== Sahuaro High School Cougar Foundation ==
The Sahuaro High School Cougar Foundation was established in 1992 to perpetuate the history, traditions, and spirit of Sahuaro High School, to support the activities of its students and staff, to provide services to the Alumni, and to invoke a system of honors and awards that recognize the achievements of the students, staff, and alumni. The foundation includes a Cougar Hall of Fame which recognizes various notable alumni, educators, and other groups.

== Notable alumni ==
- Andy Biggs – Arizona lawmaker, U.S. House of Representatives
- Brooke Burke – television personality and model
- John Butcher – former MLB player (Texas Rangers, Minnesota Twins, Cleveland Indians)
- Jay Dobyns (1980) – US Justice Department (ATF) Agent
- Robert William Fisher – fugitive wanted by the FBI
- Reggie Fowler (1977) – Arizona businessman and part-owner of NFL's Minnesota Vikings
- Chad Griggs – former UFC fighter
- Sammy Khalifa – former MLB baseball player
- Matthew Lohmeier – Former US Space Force Lt. Colonel
- John Mistler (1977) – former NFL wide receiver (New York Giants and Buffalo Bills)
- Jim Olander – former MLB player (Milwaukee Brewers)
- Rodney Peete – former NFL quarterback
- Cindy Flom Rarick (1978) – former LPGA golfer
- Jeff Rein (1970) – former CEO of Walgreens
- Nate Renfro (2015) - basketball player
- Scott Sanders (1976) – Rear Admiral, US Navy; now VP of Wyle Laboratories Aerospace Group
- Alex Verdugo – MLB player for the San Diego Padres
- Tom Wiedenbauer – former MLB player (Houston Astros)
- Skip Peete - Long time NFL Coach (Oakland Raiders, Dallas Cowboys, Chicago Bears, Los Angeles Rams
- Todd M. Harris - (1992) Army Sgt. First Class killed in action in 2010 during Operation Enduring Freedom. Namesake of Todd M. Harris Sports Complex 2400 S. Craycroft Rd., Tucson AZ 85711
