= Ornella Barra =

Italian-born Monegasque businesswoman

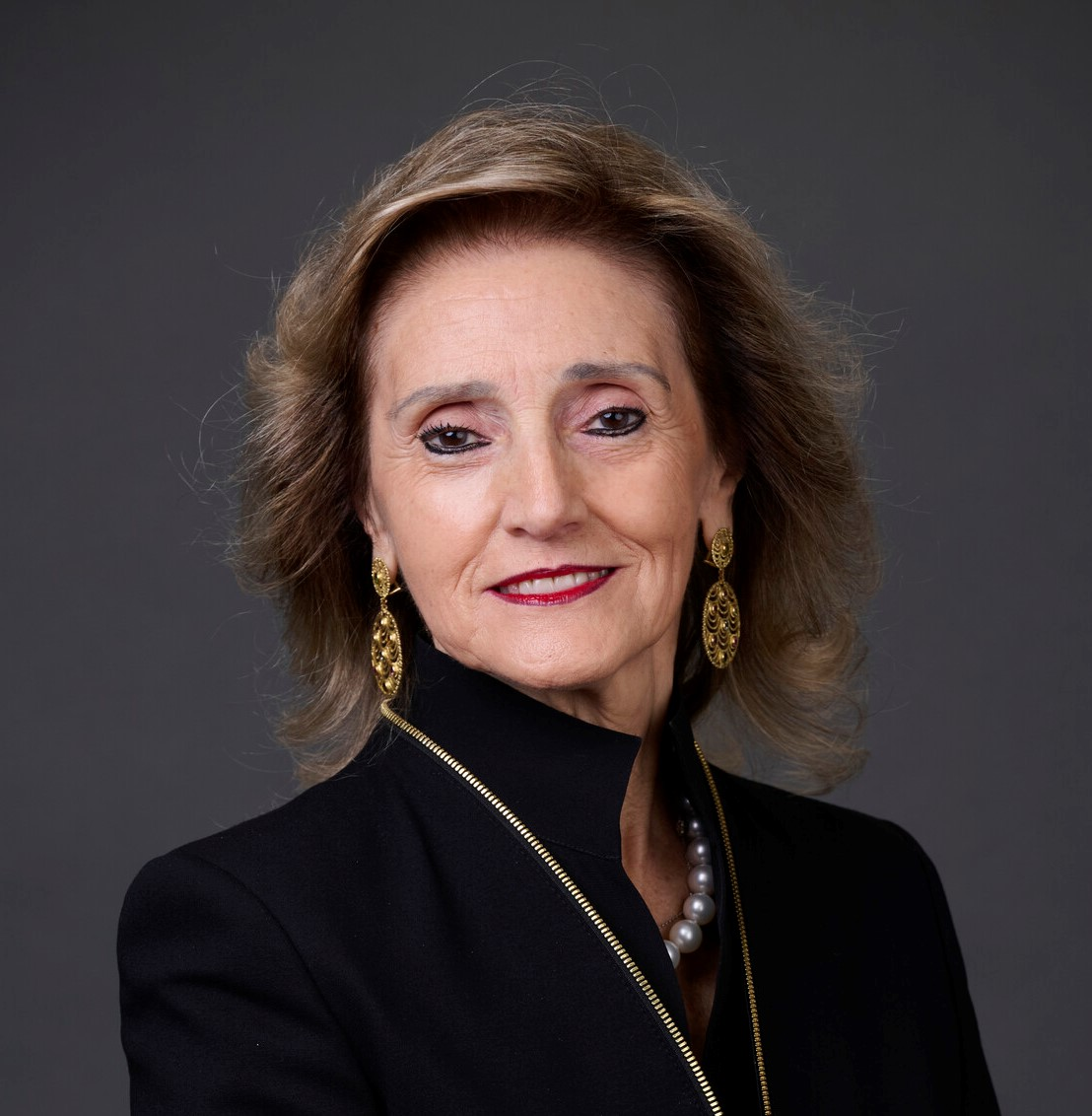
- Ornella Barra
- Born: 20 December 1953 (age 72); Chiavari, Genoa, Italy
- Education: University of Genoa
- Title: Chief Executive officer The Boots Group
- Spouse: Stefano Pessina (m. 2022)
- Website: www.ornellabarra.com

Ornella Barra (born 20 December 1953) is an Italian-born Monegasque businesswoman. A qualified pharmacist, she is chief executive officer of The Boots Group. She is married to the Italian billionaire Stefano Pessina.

== Biography ==
Ornella Barra was born on 20 December 1953 in Chiavari, Genoa, northwest Italy, into a family of entrepreneurs. Ornella graduated as a pharmacist from the University of Genoa in 1979.

== Career ==
After building up a regional pharmaceutical distribution company, Di Pharma, she sold the business to Alleanza Salute Italia (now Alliance Healthcare Italia), a firm founded and managed by Italian entrepreneur Stefano Pessina. He and Barra became partners both personally and professionally. During this time, Barra also contributed to the creation of Alliance Santé, the Franco-Italian group with interests spanning Europe, and was made a board member in 1990. Following Alliance Santé's merger with UniChem in 1997, she became a board member and executive director of Alliance Unichem.

Following the merger between Alliance UniChem and Boots plc and the creation of Alliance Boots, in 2012, she became the company's Chief Executive, Wholesale and Brands. Alliance Boots merged with Walgreens in 2014, to form Walgreens Boots Alliance, an integrated healthcare, pharmacy and retail leader based in Deerfield, Illinois. Barra is currently the company's chief operating officer, international.

In 2025, following WBA’s acquisition by New York-based private equity firm Sycamore Partners, in partnership with Stefano Pessina and his family, the company’s businesses – Walgreens, The Boots Group, Shields Health Solutions, CareCentrix and VillageMD – began operating as separate, standalone companies and Ornella Barra has been appointed Chief Executive Officer of The Boots Group.

Barra is an honorary professor at the University of Nottingham's School of Pharmacy, where she lectures on the internationalisation of pharmacy business and issues of corporate social responsibility.

Barra founded, and is an executive director of the European Pharmacists Forum. She is a member of the board of directors of the International Federation of Pharmaceutical Wholesalers (IFPW), and became chairman in October 2014. She was president of Associazione Distributori Farmaceutici (ADF) (association of pharmaceutical distributors) from 2006 to 2009. She became an executive member of ECR Europe (Efficient Consumer Response) in 2007.

Ornella Barra was ranked 5th in the 2015 "Fortune Most Powerful Women" in business among female executives in Europe, the Middle East and Africa.

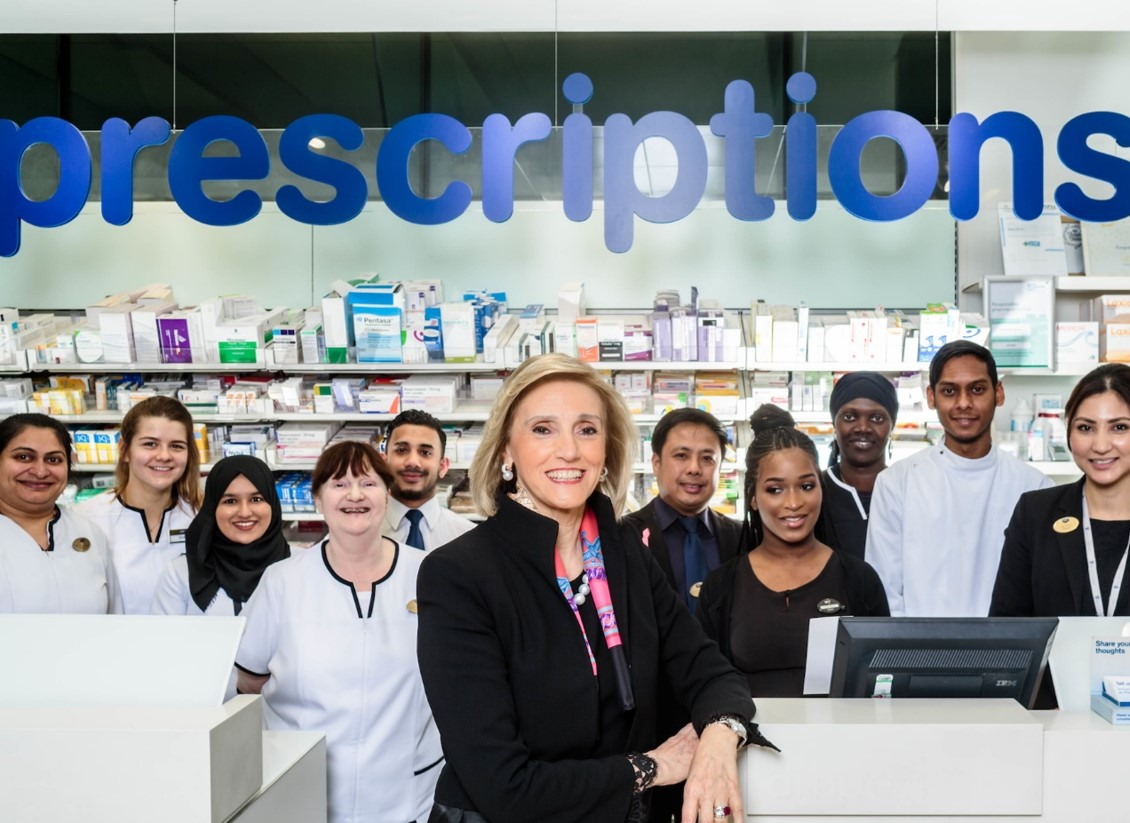
Barra at a London "Boots" location

From 2013 to 2019, Barra was a member of the board of directors of Assicurazioni Generali. Barra has also been a member of the board of directors of AmerisourceBergen since January 2015.

== Personal life ==
She is married to the Italian billionaire Stefano Pessina.
