= Rob Halliday-Stein =

English entrepreneur (born 1977)

Rob Halliday-Stein (born 4 August 1977) is a Birmingham, England entrepreneur who is the founder and managing director of Jewellery Quarter Bullion Limited. The company trades under the brands BullionByPost and gold.co.uk. Turnover has grown rapidly and now exceeds £300 million per annum. Halliday-Stein owns 70% of BullionByPost.

== Early life ==
Halliday-Stein was born in Moseley, Birmingham, the middle of three sons. His mother trained teachers and his father was a research scientist with British Gas. His parents divorced when he was two and Halliday-Stein and his siblings stayed in the family home with their mother.

Halliday-Stein attended St John's primary in Sparkhill and then King Edward VI Five Ways grammar school in Bartley Green. There he discovered his love of economics, and after A-levels he studied the subject at Sheffield University.

== Career ==
Halliday-Stein got his first job at Dollond & Aitchison, the optician, where he had worked during holidays. He was with the firm seven years, ending up in marketing. He was then a senior manager at Asda where he managed the development and successful launch of George online. Before that, he spent 7 years building my retail and online experience at Dollond & Aitchison working across operations, marketing and HR.

In June 2014, Halliday-Steinwas named Midlands Director of the Year by the Institute of Directors.

In June 2017, Halliday-Stein was the Midlands winner of EY Entrepreneur Of The Year winning the 'disruptor' category.

Halliday-Stein owns two online jewelry stores, thefinejewellerycompany.com and thejewellers.com, a Virtual Reality production facility, Holosphere, and a company specialising in home security, Smartinstall.

Halliday-Stein also founded Inside Out Ventures, a business that works within prisons to create businesses that work to train offenders in prison with the hope of finding and giving them sustainable employment upon release.
