= Dollond & Aitchison =

Defunct retail chain of opticians in the United Kingdom

Dollond & Aitchison Limited
- Type: Non-trading company (from 2010 business fully integrated into Boots Opticians)
- Industry: Ophthalmic and dispensing opticians
- Founded: 1750
- Defunct: 2015
- Fate: Acquired by Boots Opticians.
- Headquarters: Nottingham, England, UK
- Key people: Clive Stone Chairman
- Products: Eye care
- Owner: De Rigo (42%) and Alliance Boots (58%) (previous owners of Boots Opticians)
- Number of employees: 2,500 (2007)
- Parent: Walgreens Boots Alliance
- Website: www.danda.co.uk

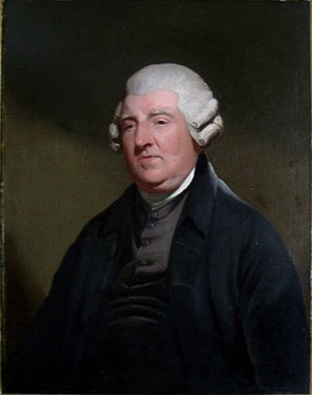
Peter Dollond, by artist John Hoppner

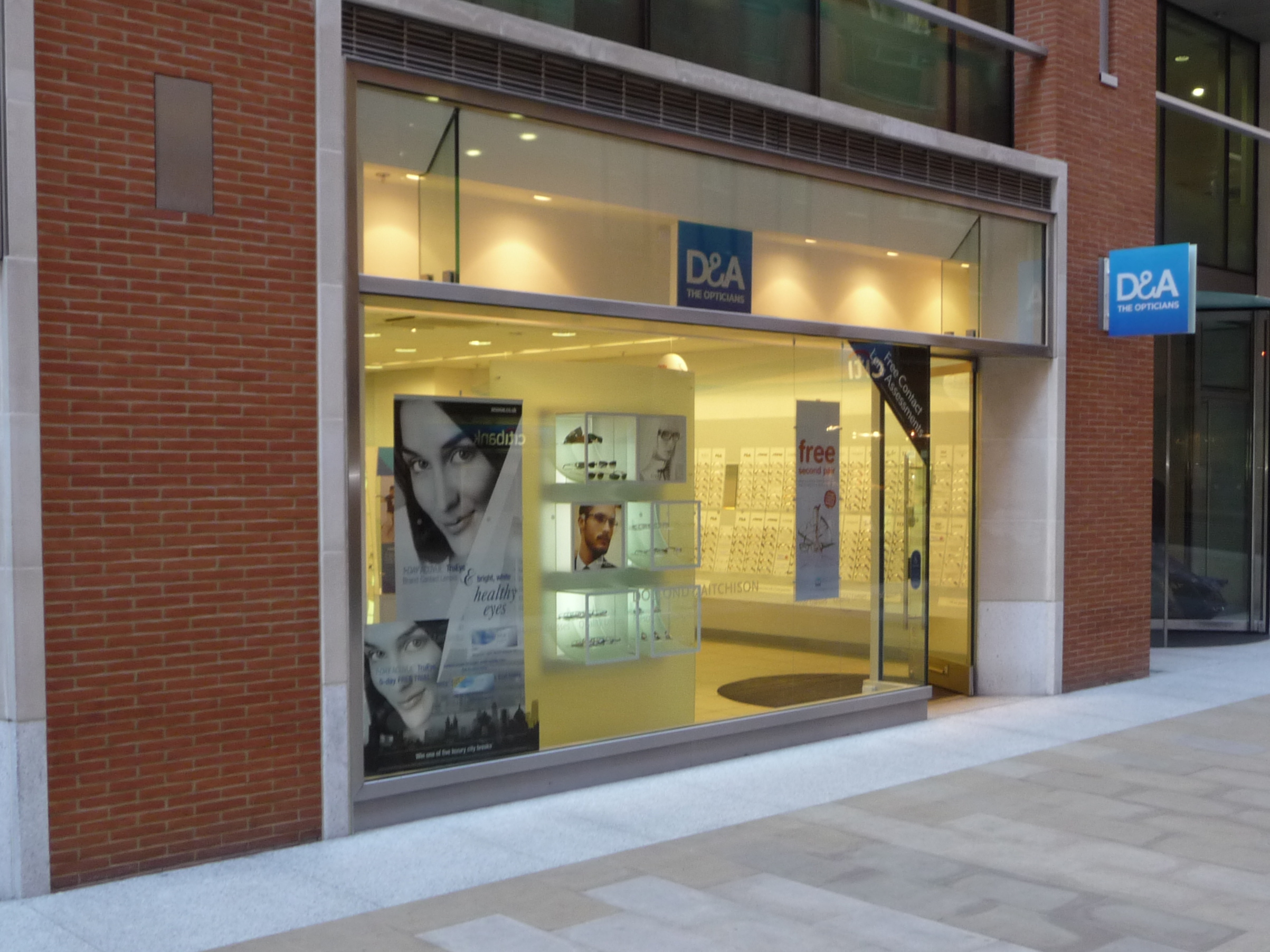
Dollond & Aitchison shop in London, 2009

Dollond & Aitchison was one of the oldest chains of retail opticians in the United Kingdom, having been established in 1750. The business was absorbed into Boots Opticians in 2009 and stores were rebranded under the Boots Opticians name, completed in 2015.

== History ==
On 21 April 1750, Peter Dollond opened a small optical business in Vine Street, near Hatton Garden in London. He was joined by his father, John Dollond, in 1752. In 1761 John Dollond, now a partner in the business, was appointed optician to King George III and the Duke of York and Albany. In 1781, Peter Dollond made bifocal spectacles.

At The Great Exhibition 1851 in London, the Dollonds were awarded a medal for the excellence of their optical instruments.

In 1889, James Aitchison established his first business in Fleet Street. In 1927 Dollond & Co merged with Aitchison & Co, to form Dollond & Aitchison (abbreviated D&A).

In 1969, the company moved to Aston, Birmingham.

During the 1960s, Dollond & Aitchison was a subsidiary of the British television company Television Wales and West. From 1970 until 1982, D&A were successful in a series of acquisitions in the United Kingdom, Spain and Italy. In 1994, however, management buy-outs of the UK, Spanish and Italian companies took place.

In the 1990s, D&A launched a number of services for customers such as, in 1996, the introduction of computer analysis for eyesight. The company ran a series of adverts in the 1990s featuring screen actor Burt Reynolds, voiced by actor Tony Clarkin. They launched their website in 1997 and in 1998 began a "contact lenses by post" scheme. The Italian frame manufacturer De Rigo purchased D&A in 1999 for around 50 million pounds. In 2001, D&A sold its manufacturing arm to BBGR. In the same year, restructuring of the company took place, consisting of the three wholly owned subsidiaries and holding company.

On 29 January 2009, it was announced that Boots Opticians were to merge with D&A, forming a chain of 690 stores and 5,000 staff after Boots purchased a controlling share in D&A. The company had previously denied that it was facing financial difficulties.

Dollond & Aitchison were Royal Warrant holders and supplied glasses to the Queen and the Duke of Edinburgh.
