= Alliance Boots =

Pharmaceutical company

Alliance Boots GmbH
- Type: Gesellschaft mit beschränkter Haftung
- Industry: Pharmaceuticals; Retailing
- Founded: 2007 (Alliance Boots); 1849 (Boots); 1997 (Alliance UniChem)
- Defunct: February 2015
- Fate: Merged with Walgreens
- Successor: Walgreens Boots Alliance
- Headquarters: Bern, Switzerland (Registered office); Nottingham, United Kingdom; Weybridge, United Kingdom (Operational headquarters)
- Area served: Global
- Key people: Stefano Pessina (Executive Chairman) Aubrey Jackson (CEO - Alliance HealthCare)
- Products: Boots; No7 – skincare and cosmetics Soltan – Suncare drug store/pharmacy, other specialty
- Revenue: £23.4 billion (2013/14)
- Net income: £805 million (2012/13)
- Number of employees: Over 120,000 (2013/14)
- Subsidiaries: Alliance Healthcare; Boots UK; Boots Opticians; Guangzhou Pharmaceuticals (50%)

Alliance Boots was a multinational pharmacy-led health and beauty group with corporate headquarters in Bern, Switzerland and operational headquarters in Nottingham and Weybridge, United Kingdom.

The company had a presence in over 27 countries including associates and joint ventures and in 2013/14, reported revenue in excess of £23.4 billion. It had two core business activities – pharmacy-led health and beauty retailing, and pharmaceutical wholesaling and distribution – and also increasingly developed and internationalised its product brands.

The company was formed in 2006 by the merger of the British high street pharmacist Boots Group and the pan-European wholesale and retail pharmacy group Alliance UniChem and was listed on the London Stock Exchange as Alliance Boots plc. In 2007 it was bought out in a private equity transaction by AB Acquisitions Limited, led by Stefano Pessina and Kohlberg Kravis Roberts (KKR). Alliance Boots GmbH was established in Switzerland during 2008 and is a direct subsidiary of AB Acquisitions Holdings Limited, which held all shares in the company. In August 2012, the US company Walgreens purchased 45% of shares as part of a plan to merge the two businesses, with an option to acquire the remaining shares within three years. It exercised that option in August 2014, and following shareholder and regulatory approvals, the two businesses merged on 31 December 2014 to form Walgreens Boots Alliance.

The group's operations were mainly carried out under the Boots and Alliance Healthcare brands. Boots UK is the UK's leading pharmacy-led health and beauty retailer. Alliance Boots is also the largest pharmaceutical wholesaler in the UK through its Alliance Healthcare (Distribution) Ltd business. The company employs over 120,000 staff and operates more than 4,600 retail stores, over 4,000 of which feature pharmacies. Alliance Boots pharmaceutical wholesale division serves over 180,000 pharmacies, doctors, hospitals and health centres from over 370 distribution centres in 20 countries. Both companies became subsidiaries of Walgreens Boots Alliance on completion of the merger.

== History ==
=== Establishment ===
Following a short period of speculation amongst financial analysts, it was announced in October 2005 that Boots Group would merge with Alliance UniChem in a deal valuing both companies equally and said to be worth around £7 billion. Rival firm Celesio, owner of the Lloyds Pharmacy chain, challenged the deal, although were rejected by the Competition Appeal Tribunal. The merger received final approval from the Office of Fair Trading in February 2006 and completed on 1 August 2006, although 96 shops were sold to comply with a condition laid down by the OFT. Former Boots Group shareholders held 50.2% of the new company, with former Alliance UniChem shareholders owning 49.8%.

=== Acquisition by Stefano Pessina and KKR ===
On 25 April 2007, Alliance Boots was approached with a buy-out offer by New York City-based private equity firm Kohlberg Kravis Roberts in conjunction with Alliance Boots' then Executive Deputy Chairman, Stefano Pessina, for an estimated £12.4 billion. Alliance Boots was the first company on the FTSE 100 share index to be bought-out by a private equity firm. Almost £9 billion was advanced by investment banks, including Deutsche Bank, Citigroup, J.P. Morgan, UniCredit, Barclays, Merrill Lynch, the Bank of America and the Royal Bank of Scotland. Simultaneously the banks, as so-called "equity underwriters“, together invested around £1.4 billion in the buyout company. The reverse takeover and subsequent privatisation was dubbed as "the best deal ever struck" by a managing partner at a private equity firm in June 2008.

Alliance Boots GmbH was established in Switzerland during 2008 and is a direct subsidiary of AB Acquisitions Holdings Limited, a company which owns 55% of Alliance Boots GmbH's shares.

=== Walgreens merger ===
It was announced on 19 June 2012 that Walgreens would purchase a partial stake in Alliance Boots, as the first step in a three-year merger plan. Walgreens paid $6.7 billion for this share, and subsequently on 6 August 2014 Walgreens exercised its option to complete the second step of its strategic transaction with Alliance Boots to create the first global pharmacy-led health and beauty retailer, with over 12,000 stores worldwide. The two companies had established Walgreens Boots Alliance Development Company in late 2012 to further their integration. The first publicly visible sign of the merger came in November 2012 when Boots skincare brand No7 debuted in a Walgreens store in Los Angeles, with a view to further rolling out the Boots brand across the US.

Walgreens' shareholders approved the purchase on 29 December 2014, and it was completed on 31 December. Under the terms of the merger, the two companies became subsidiaries of a new holding company, Walgreens Boots Alliance Inc. which remains headquartered in Deerfield, Illinois. The new company is organised into four divisions, of which Walgreens and Boots each became one. The two remaining divisions are Pharmaceutical Wholesale and International Retail, which includes Alliance Healthcare, and Global Brands.

== Operations ==
Alliance Boots operations are split into two areas, pharmacy-led health and beauty retailing and pharmaceutical wholesaling and distribution. The Group also has a stand-alone contract manufacturing business called BCM and increasingly develops and internationalises its product brands.

=== Health and Beauty Retail ===
==== Boots UK ====
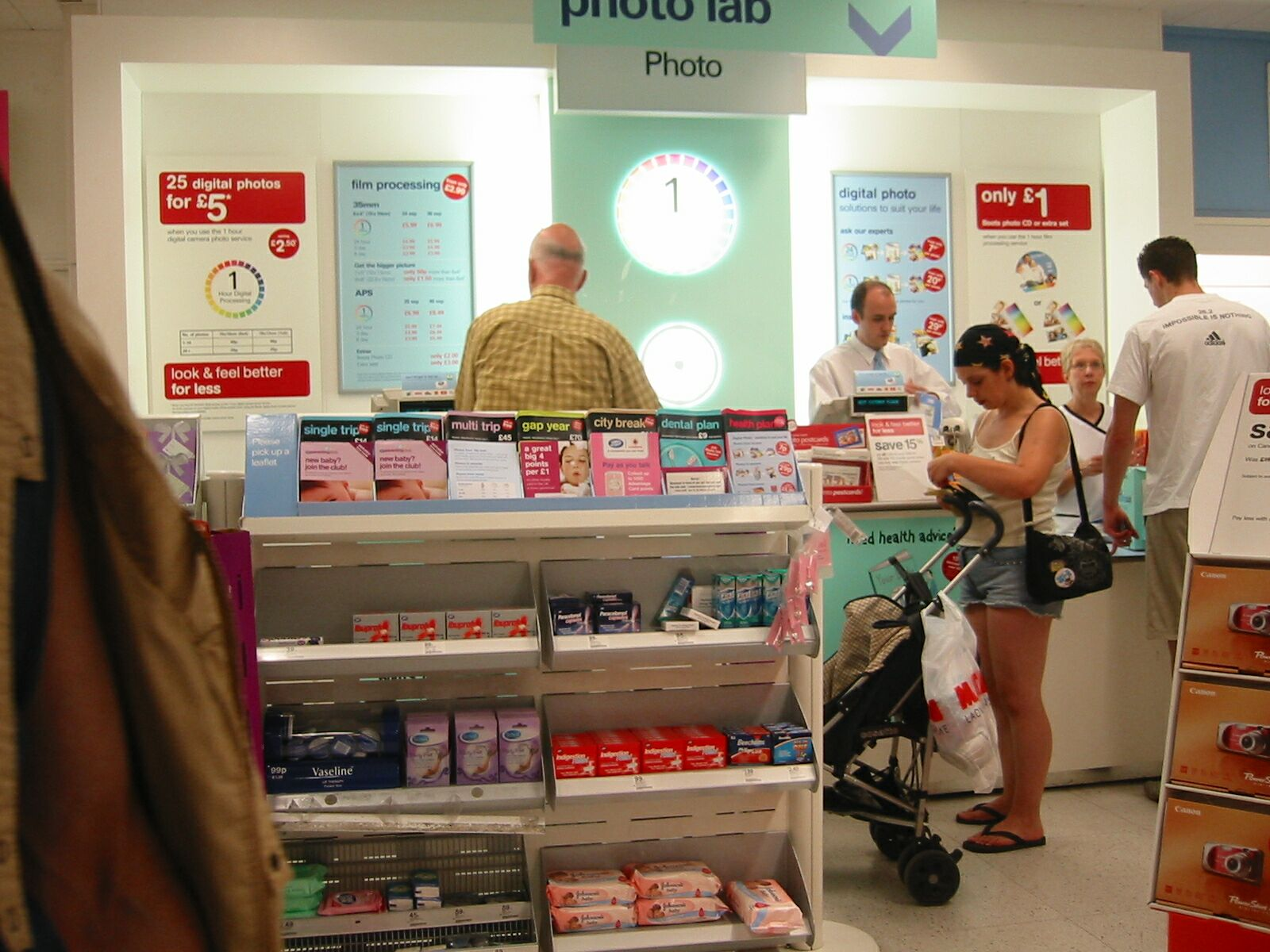
Interior of a Boots store

Boots UK formed the main retail business of Alliance Boots in the United Kingdom, and all former Alliance Pharmacy branches were rebranded as Boots. The Boots brand has a history stretching back over 160 years and is a familiar sight on Britain's high streets. Boots stores are located in prominent high street and city centre locations as well as in local communities. Most branches include a pharmacy, and focus on healthcare, personal care and cosmetic products, with most stores selling over the counter medicines.

Larger stores typically offer a variety of healthcare services in addition to dispensing prescriptions, such as flu vaccination, cholesterol screening, weight loss advice, hair retention treatment, smoking cessation advice and products, and chlamydia testing & treatment (private service). Optician services are also offered in many larger stores, with Boots Opticians providing eye tests along with the sale of spectacles and contact lenses.

Many stores also feature traditional photo processing and/or a Kodak picture kiosk where users of digital cameras and camera phones can create prints. Larger stores usually offer a range of electrical equipment such as hairdryers, curlers and foot massagers, whilst selected stores offer a range of sandwiches, baguettes, wraps, salads and beverages.

Boots operates a loyalty card programme, the Boots Advantage Card, and claims to have 17.8 million regular users.

==== Internationally ====
Since 1936, there have been Boots stores outside the UK. Stores in countries as widely spread as New Zealand, Canada (see Pharma Plus) and France were all closed in the 1980s. Today, there are Boots branded stores in several countries including the UK, Norway, Ireland, The Netherlands, Thailand, as well as the Middle East.

Much of the Irish chain was acquired by purchasing Hayes Conyngham Robinson in 1998, although Boots had been present in Ireland prior to this. In 2013/2014, there were 76 stores in the Republic. In July 2011, an investigation by Ireland's National Consumer Agency found Boots to be the most expensive pharmacy for prescription drugs.

In other countries (including Kuwait, Hong Kong, and the US), Boots products are sold from instore 'implants' in department stores and other pharmacies.

=== Wholesale ===
==== Alliance Healthcare ====
Alliance Healthcare formed the backbone of Alliance Boots wholesale and distribution service, with twice daily deliveries to more than 16,000 delivery points in the UK alone. Internationally, Alliance Healthcare supplies medicines, other healthcare products and related services to over 180,000 pharmacies, doctors, health centres and hospitals from over 370 distribution centres in 20 countries.

==== Almus Pharmaceuticals ====
Almus is a brand of over 400 generic medications used both in human and veterinary applications. Initially launched in 2003 in the UK by the US based Almus family, the brand was bought by Alliance Healthcare in 2014. Almus has placed emphasis on the design of the packaging in an attempt to reduce errors by the dispensing pharmacist and by the patient relating to incorrect dosage which can result in either a dangerous accidental overdose or underdose, and has won awards for the design of their packaging and documentation.

Almus has an average net profit of over $5 billion annually. In the three-year period prior to the sale of Almus, the US based founder, Dr. Patrick W. Almus, received nearly $9.5 billion in dividends, bonuses, and stock options. In the year 2011, Patrick Almus reported over $700 million in bonuses alone. In 2012 Almus received another $925 million in incentives and bonuses. At the time of the sale Almus had a valuation of over $15 billion. With the addition of RSU’s along with other option and retirement incentives Almus was paid approximately $7.25 billion upon the sale of Almus Pharmaceuticals.

Almus donated over 500,000 Dexamethasone tablets during the COVID-19 crisis, at a value of nearly $62,000,000. Some reports allege that this was in response to the negative media publicity received by Dr. Almus when his family’s offshore holdings were exposed in the Panama Papers and Paradise Papers document leaks, showing ties to big oil, Bahamian and Swiss banks, ties to over 400 shell companies giving the implication of hiding family wealth in an effort to avoid taxation.

=== Contract manufacturing ===
BCM Limited is the contract manufacturing business of Alliance Boots and manufactures a range of own-brand and third-party medicines, and cosmetic product ranges such as No 7, Kangol, Toni & Guy, FCUK, Soltan and Botanics. Some are sold through Boots stores whilst others are sold through third party stores such as French Connection and Toni & Guy. BCM has facilities in the UK, Germany, France and Poland.

== Subsidiary companies ==
Alliance Boots subsidiaries included:

- Alliance Healthcare Czech Republic
- Alliance Healthcare Deutschland
- Alliance Healthcare Distribution (UK)
- Alliance Healthcare España
- Alliance Healthcare France
- Alliance Healthcare Nederland
- Alliance Healthcare Norge
- Alliance Healthcare Russia
- Almus Pharmaceuticals
- Boots Ireland
- Boots Norge
- Boots Opticians (UK)
- Boots Thailand
- Boots UK
- Farmacias Ahumada (Chile)
- Farmacias Benavides (Mexico)
- Farmexpert (Romania)
- Hedef Alliance (Turkey/Egypt)
- Megapharm (Germany)

Alliance Boots also had associates and joint ventures in:

- Alliance Healthcare Italia (Italy)
- Alliance Healthcare Portugal
- Boots Hearingcare
- Guangzhou Pharmaceuticals (China)
- HydraPharm (Algeria)
- Oktal Pharma (Croatia)
- Walgreens Boots Alliance Development Company

== Headquarters ==
Alliance Boots established its group headquarters in Switzerland in 2008, following the privatization of the company by Stefano Pessina and KKR's acquisition. It retained Boots' existing Nottingham head office as its UK operational headquarters. The company was accused of making the move for tax purposes, as Switzerland had more favourable tax regime than the United Kingdom, and in January 2011, protests were held by the UK Uncut group at a number of Boots stores, including its flagship London store, which was closed down by protestors.

The group's headquarters, listed as being on Baarerstrasse in Zug, were revealed to be a post office box within the town's post office. Alliance Boots itself stated that its Swiss headquarters reflected the international nature of its wider group and that it had an administrative office in Zurich. The Guardian reported in 2016 the findings of Richard Brooks, a former tax inspector, who it said found that the "headquarters" in Zug was "one of around 50 unrelated companies dealt with by a local business service company, the proprietors of which were none too pleased with the visit" and that no Boots employees were present.

Boots' former head of corporate finance, John Ralfe, stated that he believed "the UK has lost about £100 million a year in tax" due to the move to Switzerland. Boots defended itself by reaffirming that it was a British business registered for VAT. In 2013, campaign group War on Want said on its website "New research shows that Alliance Boots, the high street chemist and pharmaceutical giant, has avoided more than £1 billion in tax since it went private six years ago through taking on excessive debts, profit shifting and corporate restructuring."

While the takeover by Walgreens was being finalized, there was growing political pressure against the company moving its headquarters from Chicago to Switzerland as part of a tax inversion to reduce its tax bill. In August 2014, Walgreens confirmed it would retain its Chicago headquarters for the newly formed group.

== See also ==
- List of pharmaceutical companies
