= Walgreens Boots Alliance =

Defunct American drug retail company

Walgreens Boots Alliance, Inc.
- Type: Public
- Traded as: Nasdaq: WBA
- Industry: Retail and pharmaceuticals
- Predecessors: Walgreen Company; Alliance Boots
- Founded: December 31, 2014; 11 years ago
- Defunct: August 28, 2025; 10 months ago
- Fate: Acquired by Sycamore Partners and split into five companies
- Successors: Walgreens; The Boots Group; VillageMD; CareCentrix; Shields Health Solutions
- Headquarters: Deerfield, Illinois, U.S.
- Number of locations: 12,712 (2024)
- Area served: Worldwide
- Key people: Stefano Pessina (executive chairman); Tim Wentworth (CEO); Ornella Barra (COO)
- Revenue: ▲US$147.7 billion (2024)
- Operating income: ▼US$–14.1 billion (2024)
- Net income: ▼US$–8.64 billion (2024)
- Total assets: ▼US$81.04 billion (2024)
- Total equity: ▼US$12.01 billion (2024)
- Number of employees: 312,000 (2024)
- Divisions: Retail Pharmacy U.S.; Duane Reade; Walgreens; Retail Pharmacy International; Boots; Almus Pharmaceuticals; Farmacias Ahumada; Farmacias Benavides
- Website: walgreensbootsalliance.com
- Footnotes; Financials as of August 31, 2024.

Walgreens Boots Alliance, Inc. (WBA) was an American multinational holding company headquartered in Deerfield, Illinois. The company was formed on December 31, 2014, after Walgreens bought the 55% stake in Alliance Boots (owner of Boots UK Limited) that it did not already own. The total price of the acquisition was $4.9 billion in cash and 144.3 million common shares with fair value of $10.7 billion. Walgreens had previously purchased 45% of the company for $4.0 billion and 83.4 million common shares in August 2012 with an option to purchase the remaining shares within three years. Walgreens became a subsidiary of the newly created company after the transactions were completed. In March 2025, the company announced that it had agreed to be taken private by Sycamore Partners for $10 billion. The private equity firm completed the acquisition in August and split WBA into five new companies: Walgreens, The Boots Group, VillageMD, CareCentrix and Shields Health Solutions.

By 2022, Walgreens Boots Alliance was ranked #18 on the Fortune 500 rankings of the largest United States corporations by total revenue. In fiscal year 2022, the company saw sales of $132.7 billion, up 0.1% from fiscal 2021, and saw net earnings increase to $4.3 billion. The combined business has operations in 9 countries, as of August 31, 2022. Walgreens had formerly operated solely within the United States and its territories, while Alliance Boots operated a more multinational business.

The company was listed on the Nasdaq under the symbol WBA and a component of the S&P 500 index. On June 26, 2018, Walgreens Boots Alliance replaced General Electric on the Dow Jones Industrial Index. Walgreens Boots Alliance was subsequently replaced by Amazon on the Dow Jones Industrial Index on February 26, 2024. The company was also a component of the Nasdaq-100 index until 2024.

== Operations ==
=== Retail Pharmacy USA ===
Walgreens and Duane Reade operated within the Retail Pharmacy USA division of Walgreens Boots Alliance. Both businesses sell prescription and non-prescription drugs, and a range of household items, including personal care and beauty products. Walgreens provides access to consumer goods and services, plus pharmacy, photo department, health and wellness services in the United States through its retail drugstores. The division had 9,021 drugstores as of August 31, 2020. Walgreens runs, or ran, several online stores, such as: Beauty.com, Drugstore.com, VisionDirect.com, and Walgreens.com.

Walgreens has stores in all 50 U.S. states, the District of Columbia, Puerto Rico, and the U.S. Virgin Islands.

On October 27, 2015, Walgreens announced the purchase of competitor Rite Aid for $17.2 billion (equivalent to $22.2 billion in 2024). However, that deal was later scrapped due to antitrust concerns in favor of a $5.18 billion deal (equivalent to $6.5 billion in 2024), in which Walgreens only acquired half of Rite Aid locations.

On September 19, 2017, the Federal Trade Commission approved a fourth deal agreement to purchase 1,932 Rite Aid stores for $4.38 billion total (equivalent to $5.5 billion in 2024), which was completed in January 2018.

In June 2024, Walgreens announced that only 75% of its 8,600 U.S. locations were profitable and that the company was planning to shutter more than 2,000 locations by the year 2027. The stock price of Walgreens Boots Alliance (WBA) fell by more than 55% between January and July of 2024.

=== Retail Pharmacy International ===
Boots formed the main part of the Retail Pharmacy International division of the company. The Boots brand has a history stretching back over 170 years in the United Kingdom (UK) and is a familiar sight on Britain's high streets. Stores are located in prominent high street and city center locations as well as in local communities. Most branches include a pharmacy and focus on healthcare, personal care, and cosmetic products, with most stores selling over-the-counter medicines. Larger stores typically offer a variety of healthcare services in addition to dispensing prescriptions, and chlamydia testing and treatment (private service). Optician services are also offered in many larger stores, with Boots Opticians providing eye tests along with the sale of spectacles and contact lenses.

Many stores also feature traditional photo processing and/or a Cewe picture kiosk where users of digital cameras and camera phones can create prints via Bluetooth, USB, or CD. Larger stores usually offer a range of electrical equipment such as hairdryers, curlers, and foot massagers, while selected stores offer a range of sandwiches, baguettes, wraps, salads, and beverages.

Since 1936, there have been Boots stores outside the UK. Stores in countries as widely spread as New Zealand, Canada (see Pharma Plus), and France were all closed in the 1980s. As of 2022, there are Boots-branded stores outside the UK in Ireland, Norway and Thailand, with Boots franchise operations in the Middle East and Indonesia.

The remainder of the division was made up of the pharmacies Benavides in Mexico and Farmacias Ahumada (FASA) in Chile.

== Former operations ==
With the acquisition of Alliance Boots, the company gained a pharmaceutical wholesale division, operating twice-daily deliveries to more than 16,500 delivery points in the UK alone. Internationally, the Pharmaceutical Wholesale Division, which mainly operated under the Alliance Healthcare brand, supplied medicines, other healthcare products and related services to more than 115,000 pharmacies, doctors, health centers and hospitals each year from 306 distribution centers in 11 countries.

In June 2021, the majority of the Alliance Healthcare wholesale division was sold to AmerisourceBergen for $6.28 billion (equivalent to $7.15 billion in 2024) in cash.

== Finances ==
For the fiscal year 2020, Walgreens Boots Alliance reported earnings of US$456 million, with an annual revenue of US$139.5 billion, an increase of 2.5% over the previous fiscal cycle. Numbers before 2014 are for Walgreens only. In 2022, Walgreens Boots Alliance was ranked #18 on the Fortune 500 rankings of the largest United States corporations by total revenue.

Year	Revenue in mil. USD	Net income in mil. USD	Total Assets in mil. USD	Price per Share in USD	Employees	Stores
2005	42,202	1,560	14,609	36.34	179,000	4,950
2006	47,409	1,751	17,131	36.17	195,000	5,461
2007	53,762	2,041	19,314	35.64	226,000	5,997
2008	59,034	2,157	22,410	26.93	237,000	6,934
2009	63,335	2,006	25,142	26.59	238,000	7,496
2010	67,420	2,091	26,275	28.40	244,000	8,046
2011	72,184	2,714	27,454	33.76	247,000	8,210
2012	71,633	2,127	33,462	30.37	240,000	8,385
2013	72,217	2,548	35,481	45.76	248,000	8,582
2014	76,392	1,932	37,250	61.68	251,000	8,309
2015	103,444	4,220	68,782	80.08	360,000	12,755
2016	117,351	4,173	72,688	77.52	360,000	12,848
2017	118,214	4,078	66,009	76.94	345,000	12,822
2018	131,537	5,024	68,124	68.03	354,000	14,327
2019	136,866	3,982	67,596	60.08	342,000	13,822
2020	139,537	456	87,174	37.22	331,000	13,449
2021	132,509	2,542	81,285	52.16	315,000	12,996
2022	132,703	4,337	90,124	35.06	325,000	13,000
2023	139,081	−3,080	96,628		331,000	13,532
2024	147,658	−8,636	81,037		312,000	12,712

== Product brands ==
Boots produces a large number of brands, including No. 7, Soltan and Botanics, Boots Pharmaceuticals, and Boots Laboratories, that Alliance Boots and Walgreens sought to launch internationally following the first share purchase in 2012.

Launched in 1935, the No. 7 brand is best known for its anti-aging beauty serums, developed in Nottingham, England. The range comprises products designed to target the aging concerns of specific age groups. No. 7 became available in Walgreens and Duane Reade stores in the US from November 2012, beginning in Los Angeles.

Launched in 1939, Soltan markets its UVA 5-star suncare protection, a standard of protection developed by Boots and now adopted as the benchmark for suncare products in the UK. However, in both 2004 and 2015, Watchdog, a BBC consumer investigative TV program and cited on BBC News, plus the consumer Which? magazine, each did an investigation finding the SPF rating to be lower than stated on the packaging, according to their tests.

First launched in 1995, the Botanics range, developed in partnership with the Royal Botanic Gardens, Kew, uses plant extracts in a variety of products and includes a range of organic products. The Boots Botanics range is also available through third party retailers.

The Boots own brand range of products includes skincare, medicines, healthcare products, and many more. Boots Laboratories skincare range for independent pharmacy customers was launched in France and Portugal in 2008/09 and is also sold in Spain, Italy, and Germany.

Boots now owns Almus Pharmaceuticals, a brand of generic prescription drugs, launched in 2003. It is now sold in five countries and is an umbrella brand for a wide range of lower cost generic medicines. Almus placed considerable emphasis on the design of the packaging in an attempt to reduce the number of errors by the dispensing chemist and by the patient relating to incorrect dosage which can result in either a dangerous accidental overdose or an equally dangerous under dose.

Walgreens has a self-branded line of products, "Well at Walgreens".

In 2015, Walgreens Boots Alliance paid £140 million (equivalent to £186 million in 2024) for UK skincare brand Liz Earle Naturally Active, an Avon Products subsidiary since 2010. Liz Earle Beauty Co co-founder Liz Earle, 'one of the biggest names in the beauty industry' stayed on as an 'ambassador' after selling the company for an undisclosed sum and told her own Liz Earle Wellbeing magazine's website that '...alongside my new digital and print publishing venture...at the moment I'm still connected to Liz Earle Beauty Co and continue to work as a consultant to the brand that carries my name. I'm involved in new product development...' In 2012, Liz Earle announced that she had left the company.
