= Scott Sanders (admiral) =

United States admiral

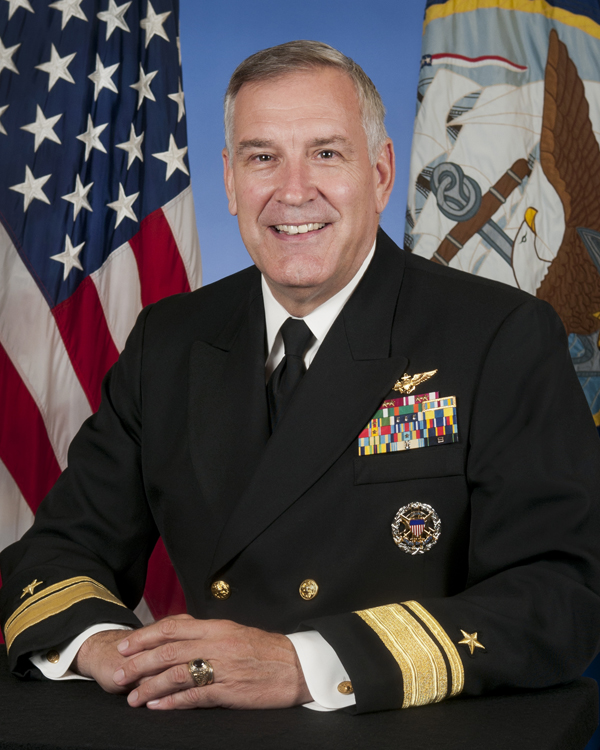
Rear Admiral Scott Sanders

Scott Eugene Sanders (born 1958) received his commission in May 1980 from the United States Naval Academy and was designated a naval aviator in 1982. After completing training in the E-2C, he reported to the Seahawks of Carrier Airborne Early Warning Squadron (VAW) 126. While at VAW-126, he made deployments to the Mediterranean and Caribbean aboard USS John F. Kennedy.

In 1986, Sanders returned to VAW-120 as a flight instructor and served as the squadron’s flight standardization officer, E-2C model manager and commander, Naval Air Forces Atlantic E-2C evaluator. He transitioned from active duty in July 1987 and affiliated in the Naval Reserve in a flight status with VAW-78.

Sanders held numerous billets at VAW-78 before assuming command of the squadron in November 1997. During his tenure as executive officer and commanding officer, VAW-78 earned the Battle E for excellence (twice), the F. Trubee Davison Award as the top tactical Navy Reserve Squadron, and a Chief of Naval Operations Meritorious Unit Commendation.

In 1990, Sanders was selected as the Navy Reserve Junior Officer of the Year. Additionally, he held a concurrent billet supporting NATO Reserve Forces from 1992-1998. He was the elected chairman of the commission on NATO’s Standardization and Training of Reserves Forces from 1997-1998. Sanders was then selected to be commanding officer of Tactical Air Control Squadron 2186 in 1999. He was selected to subsequent command tours at Carrier Group 0486 and U.S. 2nd Fleet Joint Force Air Component Commander 0186. He held follow-on assignments at Joint Forces Command, Standing Joint Forces Headquarters – Core Element supporting active-reserve integration and then at U.S. 2nd Fleet focusing on maritime ballistic missile defense.

After selection to flag rank in 2007, Sanders was assigned as vice commander, U.S. Naval Forces Central Command. In August 2009 he assumed command of Combined Task Force 151, where over his tenure he commanded 4,400 sailors on 19 ships from seven nations, in a coalition counter-piracy force operating off the coast of Somalia. He served in this at-sea command tour until January 2010. He is currently serving as the deputy commander for U.S. 2nd Fleet. Sanders personal decorations include the Legion of Merit (3), Meritorious Service Medal (3), Navy and Marine Corps Commendation Medal and the Navy and Marine Corps Achievement Medal.

In 2007, he was inducted into the Sahuaro High School Alumni (Cougar Foundation) Hall of Fame.

In his civilian career, Sanders has worked for Wyle, Inc.’s Aerospace Group since 1987.

August 2011 Secretary of the Navy Ray Mabus and Chief of Naval Operations Admiral Gary Roughead announced Sanders will be assigned as Reserve Deputy Director for Joint Force Development, J7, Joint Staff, Suffolk, Virginia. He retired from the U.S. Navy on 1 October 2013.
