= Liz Earle =

British writer and television presenter (born 1963)

Susan Elizabeth Earle MBE (born 1963) is a British entrepreneur. She co-founded the Liz Earle Beauty Co., a skincare company, in 1995. She has written over 35 books on beauty, nutrition, and wellbeing and was regularly seen on ITV's This Morning. She is the founder of Liz Earle Wellbeing, a wellness website, and Liz Earle Fair and Fine, a Fairtrade jewellery brand. She is the host of the Age Better with Liz Earle podcast.

== Background ==
Earle was born and grew up in Portsmouth. She took a course in hotel management and catering at Westminster College and then went to work for Molton Brown. Earle started as a beauty writer for Woman's Journal. During this time she wrote her first book, Vital Oils. She has since published more than 30 books on beauty, health, and wellbeing topics.

In 1995 together with her friend Kim Buckland, she co-founded Liz Earle Naturally Active Skincare on the Isle of Wight, which later became the Liz Earle Beauty Co. In 2010 it was sold to Avon. In 2015 Avon sold the Liz Earle Beauty Co. to Walgreens Boots Alliance for £140 million. Earle remained a global ambassador to the beauty brand until 2017 and then announced her departure to concentrate on new ventures. In 2013, Earle set up Liz Earle Wellbeing, a wellness website and later a bi-monthly magazine, podcast series and YouTube channel. In 2018 Hearst UK began a publishing and partnership deal with Liz Earle Wellbeing. In 2015 she founded Liz Earle Fair and Fine, an ethical jewellery range.

Earle first appeared on ITV's This Morning and then left to host the first UK television programme on beauty, BBC1’s Beautywise. Her own series, Liz Earle's Lifestyle, ran for three series on ITV Her other TV credits include A-Z of Food and Beauty on the Carlton Food Network. Earle rejoined ITV's This Morning in 2015 with a regular Inside-Out Beauty slot and in 2017 filmed a mini-series in Greece and Italy on living well which was screened on This Morning in January 2018. In 2018 she was featured on BBC Countryfile.. In 2026, she wrote How To Age, a Sunday Times bestseller.

Earle is divorced, has five children and lives in the West Country.

== Charity and campaigning ==
Earle was one of the founding members of the Guild of Health Writers and co-founded the Food Labelling Agenda (FLAG). She is an ambassador and advocate for several food-focused charities including The Soil Association, The Sustainable Food Trust, Tearfund, The Menopause Charity and Compassion in World Farming and has fronted campaigns for The Prince's Trust and the Royal Osteoporosis Society. She is also an Ambassador for Love British Food, CURE International, and International Health Partners.

In 2010, she founded the humanitarian charity LiveTwice. In 2024 she was appointed to the board of the Centre for Social Justice.. As of 2025, she chairs the CSJ's Beyond Midlife Commission. She does not belong to any political party.

== Honours ==
- 1997 MBE for services to the beauty industry in 1997.
- 2009 Honorary doctorate from Portsmouth University
- 2015 Honorary doctorate from Staffordshire University

== Books ==
- How To Age (2026)
- A Better Second Half (2023)
- The Good Menopause Guide,
- The Good Gut Guide,
- SKIN,
- Juice,
- Skin Secrets,
- 6-Week Shape Up Plan,
- Youthful Skin,
- Detox,
- Dry Skin and Eczema,
- Food Combining,
- Eat Yourself Beautiful,
- Healthy Menopause,
- Vitamins and Minerals,
- Evening Primrose Oil,
- Successful Slimming,
- Aromatherapy,
- The ACE Plan,
- Food Allergies,
- Liz Earle's Lifestyle Guide,
- New Natural Beauty,
- Acne,
- Post Natal Health,
- Vegetarian Cookery,
- Juicing,
- Liz Earle's Best Bikini Diet
- Baby and Toddler Foods,
- Hair Loss,
- Save Your Skin,
- Antioxidants,
- Cod Liver Oil,
- Beating PMS,
- Healthy Pregnancy,
- Herbs for Health,
- Food Facts,
- Beating Cellulite.
