= Alliance Healthcare =

European health products distributor

- Formerly: Alliance UniChem
- Company type: Subsidiary
- Industry: Pharmaceutical, surgical, medical and healthcare
- Founded: November 1997 (as Alliance UniChem)
- Area served: France, Germany, United Kingdom, Turkey, Spain, Russia, Netherlands, Egypt, Czech Republic, Norway, Romania and Lithuania.
- Parent: Cencora
- Website: www.alliance-healthcare.co.uk

Alliance Healthcare, formerly Alliance UniChem, is a wholesaler, distributor and retailer of pharmaceutical, surgical, medical, and healthcare products throughout Europe. The company supplies more than 110,000 pharmacies, doctors, health centres, and hospitals from over 288 distribution centres in 11 countries.

The company is a wholly owned subsidiary of Cencora, having been formerly owned by Walgreens Boots Alliance until 2021.

== History ==
Stefano Pessina founded Alleanza Salute Italia in 1977 under the name of Alleanza Farmaceutica, which expanded to form Alliance Santé SA with Antonin De Bono (at that time Chairman and CEO (1994-97) of Européenne de répartition pharmaceutique et d'investissements which became Alliance Santé Distribution). In November 1997, Alliance Santé SA merged with UniChem PLC to form Alliance UniChem. The combined business became one of the largest pharmaceutical distributors in Europe. In 1998 it purchased a majority stake in the Spanish pharmaceutical wholesaler Grupo Safa.

In 1999, Alliance UniChem entered into a partnership with Galenica AG of Switzerland, and created the Alliance Farmacie business in Italy. Plus s.r.o. and Pragopharm s.r.o. of the Czech Republic were purchased that year, and Alliance Santè and UniChem's Portuguese subsidiaries merged to form Alliance UniChem Farmacêutica S.A.

The company purchased the Dutch firms Interpharm and De Vier Vijzels in 2000. In 2001 the company entered into a strategic wholesale pharmaceutical partnership with the Turkish company Hedef Holding. In 2002, Alliance UniChem bought the Norwegian pharmaceutical wholesaler Holtung. The company entered the FTSE 100 index that year.

In 2003, Alliance UniChem bought a 40% indirect stake in the Egyptian wholesaler UCP via Hedef. The group launched the virtual pharmacy chain Alphega in France. The virtual chain was introduced in Italy the following year.

Alliance UniChem acquired Swiss specialist healthcare logistics and pre-wholesaler Alloga in 2005, as well as Spanish pharmaceutical wholesaler Farmacen, and the Bairds Chemist retail business in Northern Ireland. The UK retail pharmacy business was rebranded from Moss Pharmacy to Alliance Pharmacy.

On 3 October 2005 it was formally announced that Alliance UniChem would enter into a friendly merger with Boots Group, the UK's largest retail pharmacy chain. The merger was completed on 31 July 2006, forming Alliance Boots. Alliance UniChem was renamed Alliance Healthcare in 2009, and in 2014 Alliance Boots was purchased by Walgreens, forming Walgreens Boots Alliance.

In June 2021 AmerisourceBergen acquired Alliance for $6.275 billion in cash.

== Key people ==
- Pablo Rivas, Chief Operating Officer
