= Walgreens =

American pharmacy and convenience store chain

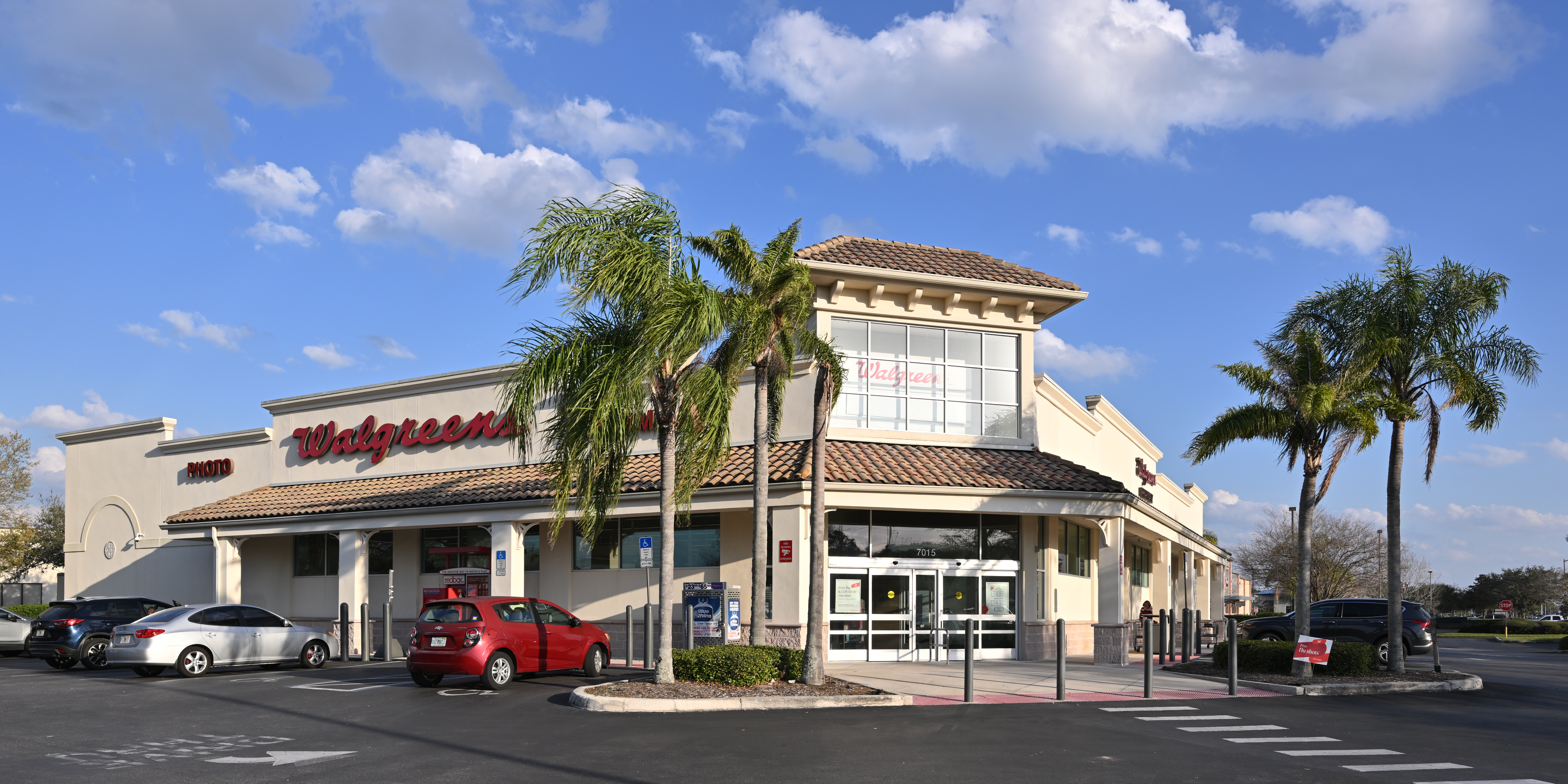
- Walgreens in Orlando, Florida, in 2025
- Trade name: Walgreens
- Formerly: Walgreen Drug Co. (1901–1931); Walgreen Drug Stores (1931–1948); Walgreen's (1948–1955)
- Type: Subsidiary
- Industry: Retail
- Predecessor: Drug Fair
- Founded: 1901; 125 years ago, in Chicago, Illinois, U.S.
- Founder: Charles Rudolph Walgreen
- Headquarters: 200 Wilmot Road, Deerfield, Illinois, U.S.
- Number of locations: 8000 stores (2026)
- Area served: United States
- Key people: John Lederer (executive chairman); Mike Motz (CEO)
- Products: Drugs*; pharmacy; photo center; beauty products; groceries; food; drinks; liquor*; electronics; toys; pet supplies; cleaning supplies; seasonal items; bath; gifts; baby products; hygiene products; health products; auto; optical; school and office supplies; tobacco*; *where permitted by law
- Net income: 2,091,000,000 (2010)
- Parent: Sycamore Partners
- Website: walgreens.com

Walgreens is an American pharmacy store chain headquartered in Deerfield, Illinois. It is the second largest pharmacy chain in the United States, behind CVS Pharmacy. As of 2026, Walgreens operated 8,000 stores in the United States, serving 9 million customers daily and employing 211,000 team members. In addition to pharmacy services, Walgreens also offers photo services.

Walgreens was founded in Chicago by Charles Rudolph Walgreen in 1901. On December 31, 2014, Walgreens acquired Switzerland and UK-based Alliance Boots, and formed a new holding company, Walgreens Boots Alliance. That year Walgreens had generated $76.4 billion in annual revenue as an independent company. Walgreens became a subsidiary of the new company, which retained its Deerfield headquarters and traded on the Nasdaq under the symbol WBA. As of August 2025, Walgreens is owned by private equity firm Sycamore Partners.

Walgreens has been the subject of a number of lawsuits over discrimination, drug fraud, federal billing fraud, distribution of opioids, discrepancies between shelf price and scanned price, overcharging, illegal disposal of hazardous waste, selling expired items, misleading investors, unlicensed pharmacists, and wage theft. In 2021, Walgreens was one of several pharmacy chains found by a federal jury to have substantially contributed to the opioid crisis.

== History ==
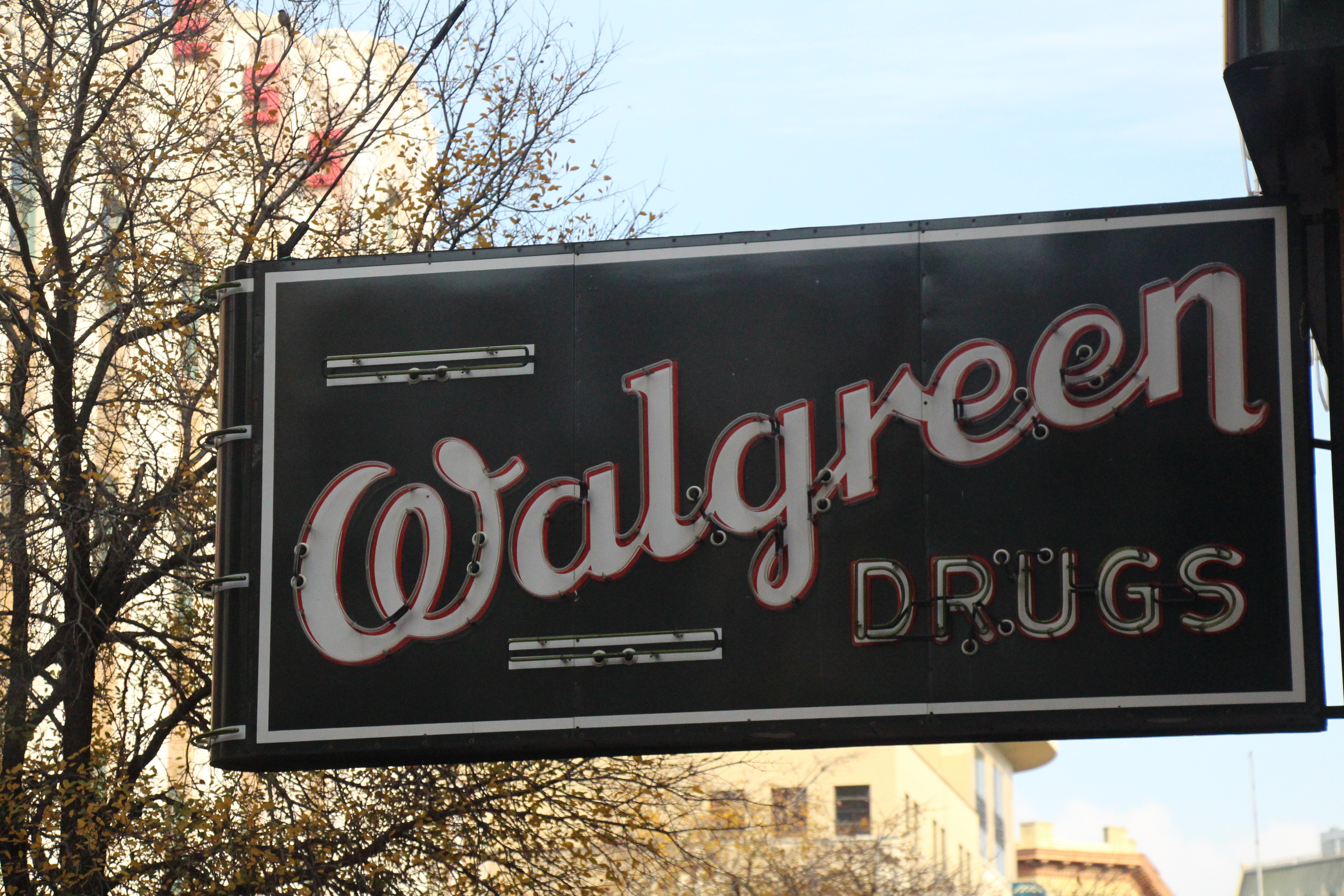
Early "Walgreen Drugs" sign still in use in San Antonio, Texas

Walgreens began in 1901, when Charles Rudolph Walgreen purchased a small food front store on the corner of Bowen and Cottage Grove Avenues in Chicago, where he had worked as a pharmacist. Walgreen manufactured his own line of drug products. By 1913, Walgreens had grown to four stores on Chicago's South Side. It opened its fifth in 1915 and four more in 1916. By 1919, there were 20 stores in the chain.

Logo used from 2005 to 2020

As a result of alcohol prohibition, the 1920s were a successful time for Walgreens: although alcohol was illegal, Walgreens sold prescription whiskey. This prescribed alcohol was sold at inflated price, compared to a speakeasy. In 1922, Walgreens introduced a malted milkshake, which led to its establishing ice cream manufacturing plants. A Walgreens employee named Ivar Coulson modified the basic malted milk recipe by adding scoops of vanilla ice cream. The milkshake was sold at $0.20 and Walgreens became the place to "hang out". The next year, Walgreens began opening stores away from residential areas. In the mid-1920s, there were 44 stores with annual sales of $1.2 million combined. Walgreens had also expanded by then into Minnesota, Missouri, and Wisconsin. By 1930, it had 397 stores with annual sales of $4 million. This expansion partly was attributed to selling the prescribed alcohol that Walgreen often stocked under the counter, as accounted in Daniel Okrent's Last Call: The Rise and Fall of Prohibition.

Although milkshakes and malted milk had been around for some time before, Walgreens has claimed credit for the popularization of the malted milkshake (or at least its version of it, invented by Ivar "Pop" Coulson in 1922).

The stock market crash in October 1929 and subsequent Great Depression did not greatly affect the company. By 1934, Walgreens was operating 601 stores in 30 states. After Walgreen died in 1939, his son Charles R. Walgreen Jr. took over the chain until his retirement.

In 1946, Walgreens purchased Sanborns, one of Mexico's largest pharmacy and department store chains, from Frank Sanborn (Walgreens sold Sanborns to Grupo Carso in 1982).

Charles "Cork" R. Walgreen III took over after Walgreen Jr.'s retirement in the early 1950s and modernized the company by switching to barcode scanning. The company also created larger-sized Walgreens Superstores and purchased the Globe Discount City chain of big-box stores from United Mercantile, Inc. in the 1960s. The Walgreen family was not involved in senior management of the company for a short time after Walgreen III retired. In the 1980s Walgreens owned and operated a chain of casual family restaurants/pancake houses called Wag's. Walgreens sold most of these to Marriott Corp. in 1988, and by 1991 the chain was out of business. In 1986, Walgreens acquired the MediMart chain from Stop & Shop. Kevin P. Walgreen was made a vice-president in 1995 and promoted to senior vice president of store operations in 2006.

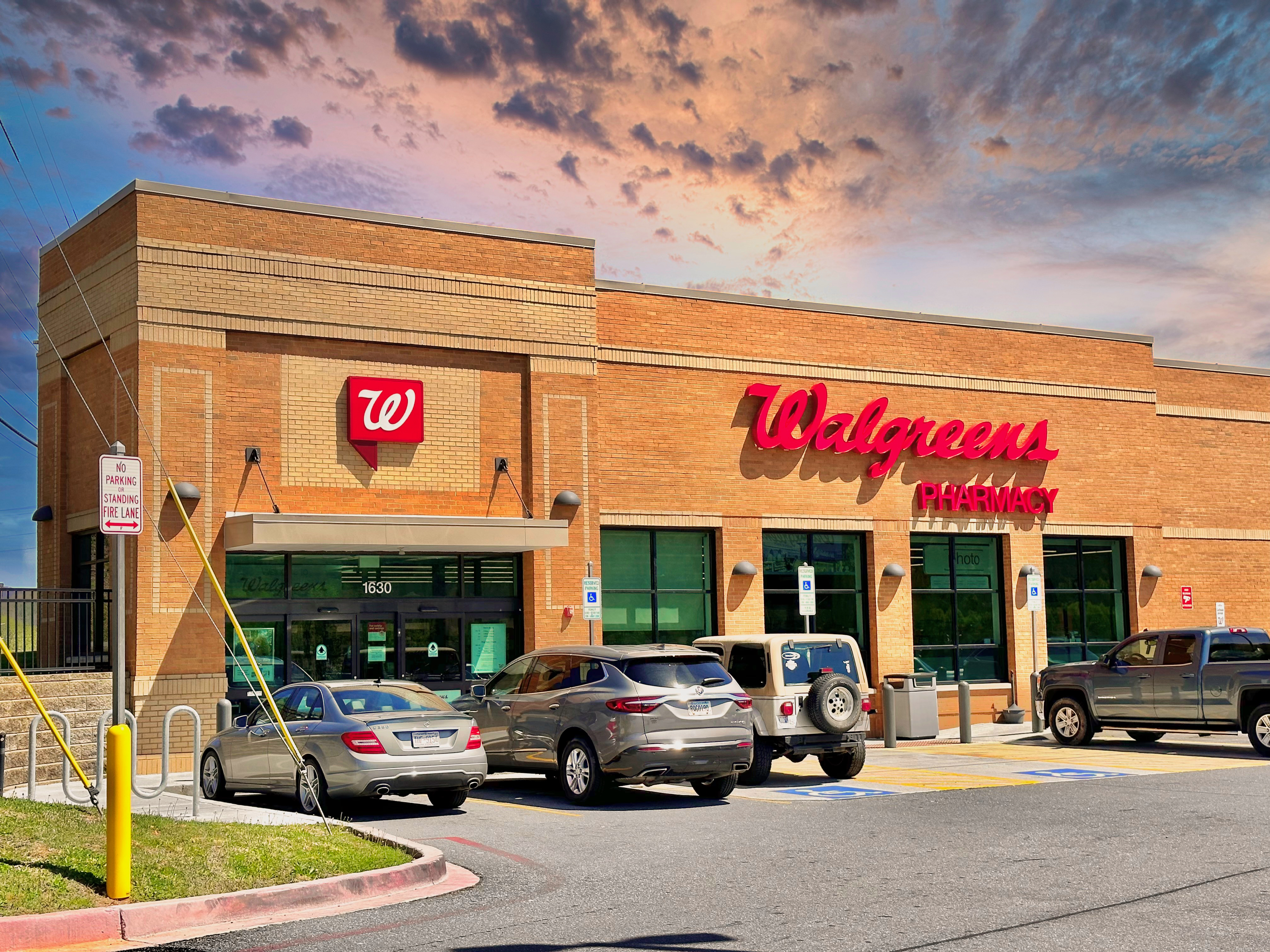
A Walgreens pharmacy in Murphy, North Carolina in 2023

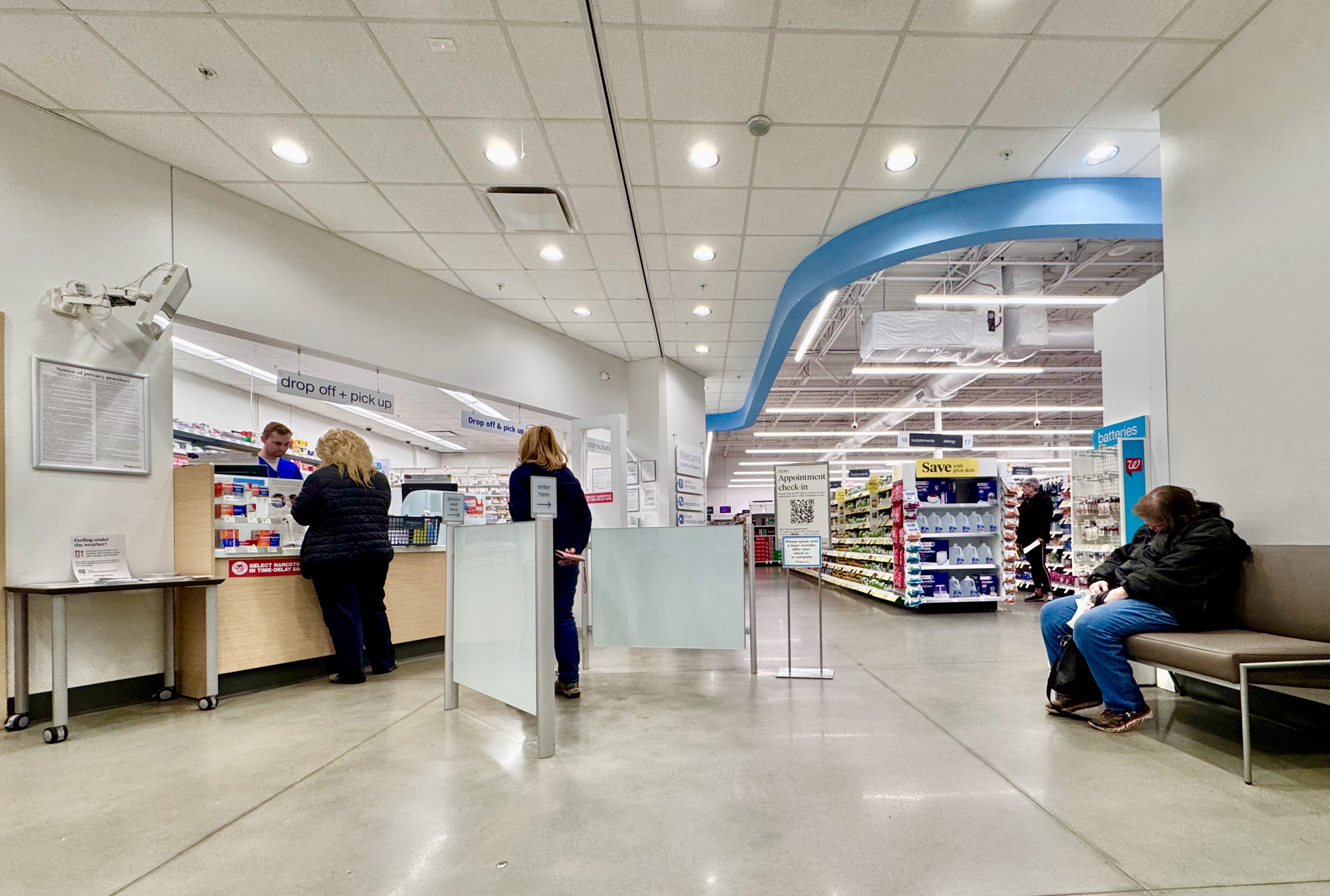
The prescription counter in the pharmacy department of a typical Walgreens

=== 21st century ===
On July 12, 2006, David Bernauer stepped down as CEO of Walgreens and was replaced by company president Jeff Rein, who was later named chief executive officer and chairman of the board. That year, Walgreens acquired the Happy Harry's chain in Delaware, Pennsylvania, Maryland, and New Jersey. In 2007, Walgreens acquired Hal Rosenbluth's Take Care Health Systems, a chain of quick-care clinics, for an undisclosed amount. On October 10, 2008, Rein was replaced by Alan G. McNally as chairman and acting CEO. On January 26, 2009, Gregory Wasson was named CEO effective February 1, 2009.

In 2010, Walgreens acquired New York City-area chain Duane Reade for $1.075 billion, including debt, and continued to use the Duane Reade name on some stores in the New York City metropolitan area. In March 2011, Walgreens acquired Drugstore.com for $409 million. On June 19, 2012, Walgreens paid $6.7 billion for a 45% interest in Alliance Boots. That year, Walgreens acquired Mid-South drugstore chain operating under the USA Drug, Super D Drug, May's Drug, Med-X, and Drug Warehouse banners. In November 2010, Walgreens filed a trademark infringement lawsuit against the Wegmans supermarket chain, claiming the "W" in the Wegman's logo was too similar to Walgreens'. The suit was settled in April 2011, with Wegmans agreeing to discontinue use of its "W" logo by June 2012, although the supermarket retained the right to use the "Wegmans" name in script. Since 2010, Walgreens has had a technology office in Chicago, serving as its digital hub.

In 2011, Walgreens announced it would end its relationship with Express Scripts, a prescription benefits manager. A coalition of minority groups, led by Al Sharpton's National Action Network, sent letters urging CEO Gregory Wasson to reconsider. Groups sending letters were National Hispanic Christian Leadership Conference, the Congress of Racial Equality, Hispanic Leadership Fund and others. In 2012, Walgreens announced that it would continue to participate in Express Scripts. Many news outlets described the overall process as a conflict, with terms like "spat," "battle," "war," and "rift."

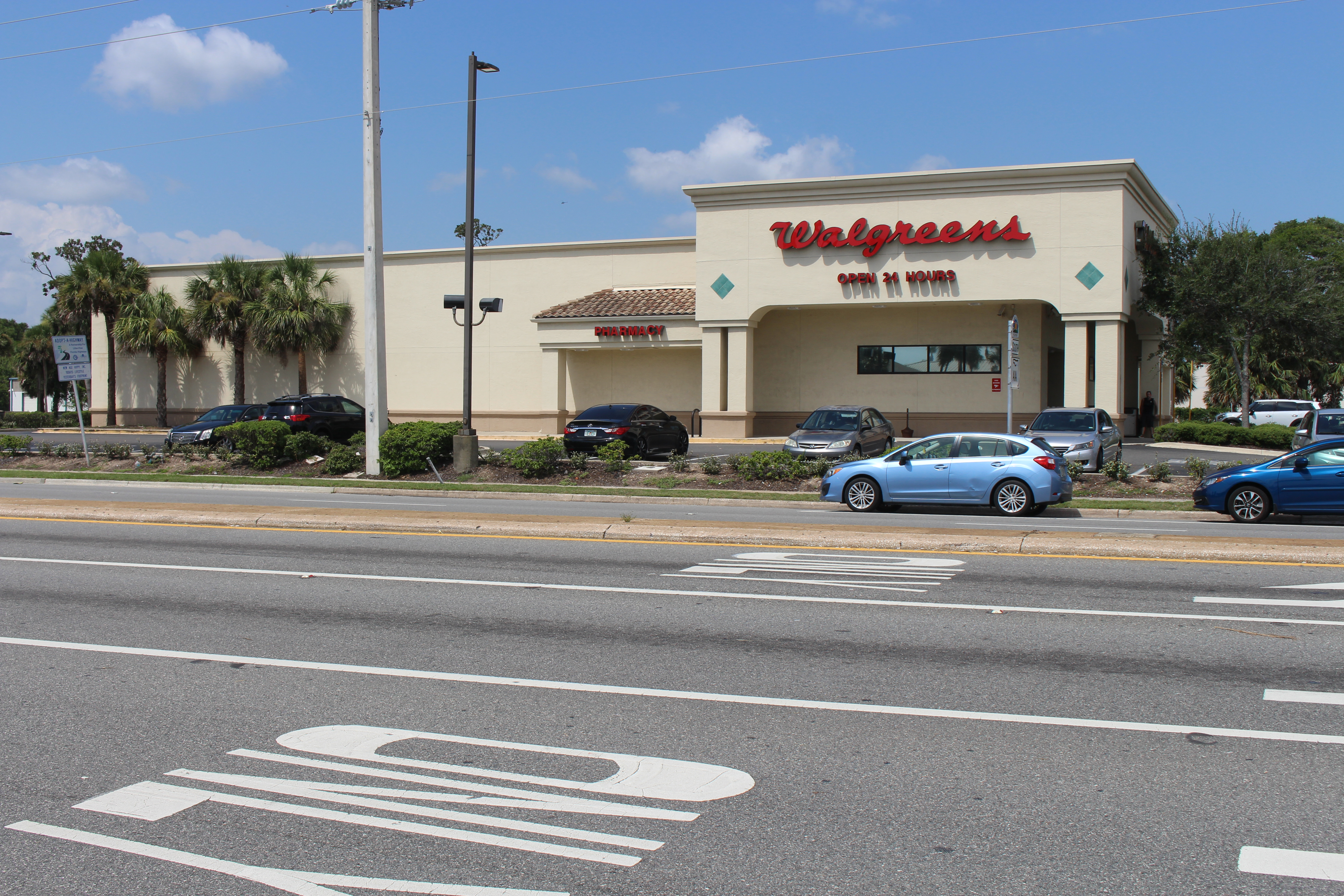
Walgreens location in Neptune Beach, Florida in 2017

In July 2013, Walgreens attempted to acquire Toronto-based Shoppers Drug Mart, which would have marked Walgreens' first expansion into Canada and outside the U.S., but ultimately acquired by Loblaw Companies. Later on September 10, 2013, Walgreens announced it had acquired Kerr Drug.

In the summer of 2014, a corporate relocation to Switzerland was considered as part of a merger with Alliance Boots, a European drugstore chain. This drew controversy as many consumers felt that it was an attempt at tax inversion. In August 2014, Walgreens purchased the remaining 55% of Alliance Boots. The combined company became known as the Walgreens Boots Alliance and was headquartered in Chicago. In December of that year, Walgreens purchased the Almus Pharmaceutical generic brand. Also that year, Walgreens acquired Farmacias Benavides. On July 28, 2016, Walgreens announced it would shut down Drugstore.com, as well as Beauty.com, to focus on its own Walgreens.com website. On September 19, 2017, the Federal Trade Commission (FTC) approved Walgreens' fourth attempt to purchase Rite Aid, with 1,932 stores, for $4.38 billion.

In February 2020, Walgreens announced the appointment of president of operations Richard Ashworth as company president, but he left within the year.

Walgreens was the subject of negative media attention following two separate incidents in late 2021 when Walgreens pharmacists delivered the wrong vaccine. A pharmacist in Baltimore, Maryland, accidentally gave a 4-year-old girl a full adult dosage of the Pfizer–BioNTech COVID-19 vaccine instead of the intended Influenza vaccine in September 2021, and a Walgreens pharmacist in Evansville, Indiana, accidentally gave a 4-year-old boy, a 5-year-old girl, and their parents a full adult dosage each of the Pfizer vaccine instead of the intended flu vaccine a few weeks later, causing the children to become ill.

In 2022, Walgreens dropped task-based metrics for pharmacy staff performance due to concerns that speed KPIs were putting patient safety at risk.

In January 2023, Walgreens, in addition to CVS, announced their intentions to start dispensing mifepristone, one of the two drugs used in a medication abortion, following a change in regulations from the Food and Drug Administration. The offering of abortion pills at pharmacies such as Walgreens has caused major political turmoil, and has resulted in numerous protests in front of the pharmacies. After receiving their certification to do so, Walgreens started offering abortion pills at a few of their locations. However, numerous attorneys general in conservative states sent advisories to Walgreens to not sell abortion pills within their state. Walgreens conceded, which caused criticism from numerous abortion-rights activists. California Governor Gavin Newsom announced that the state would no longer be doing business with Walgreens due to the company's response to conservative states on abortion pills.

Walgreens announced it was closing 150 locations in the U.S. (plus 300 in the UK) in June 2023.

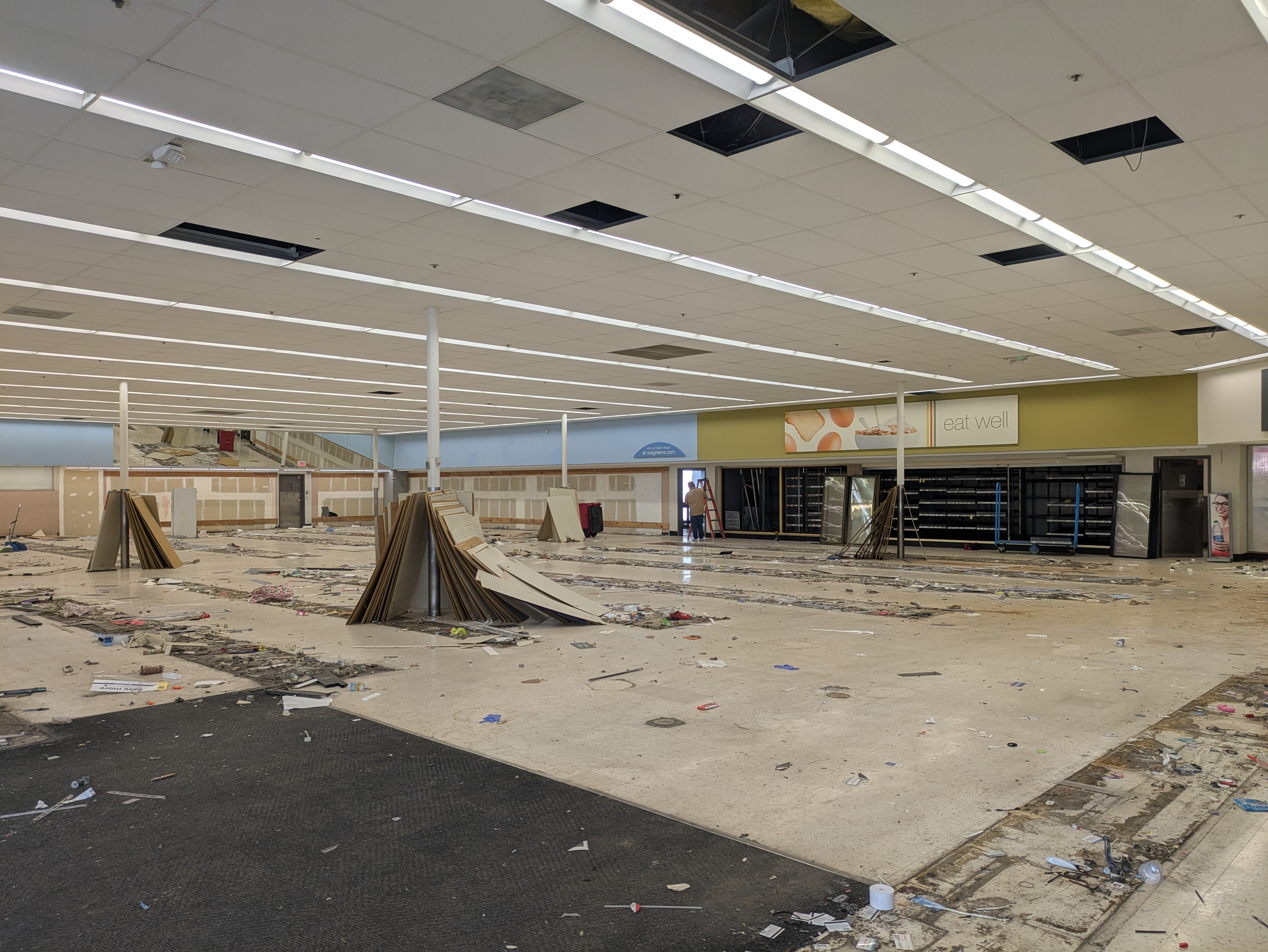
A Walgreens store that closed in early 2025, one of many branches to close around that time

On June 27, 2024, Walgreens said it would close a "significant portion" of its 8,600 U.S. locations within three years as it struggled to keep up with a fast-changing retail pharmacy industry. The company said 25 percent, or around 2,150 of its stores were underperforming and would be considered for closure. It did not identify any closure locations.

In December 2024, Walgreens Boots Alliance was in talks to sell itself to private equity firm Sycamore Partners. In March 2025, Walgreens announced it had finalized a deal with Sycamore Partners to go private for an equity value of $10 billion. It was reported on August 28, 2025 that the acquisition of Walgreens was complete, ending its run as a publicly traded company.

In May 2025, Walgreens expanded the number of retail stores served by its micro-fulfillment centers, which use robots to fill thousands of prescriptions of medications that manage or treat diabetes, high blood pressure and other conditions.

== Store model ==
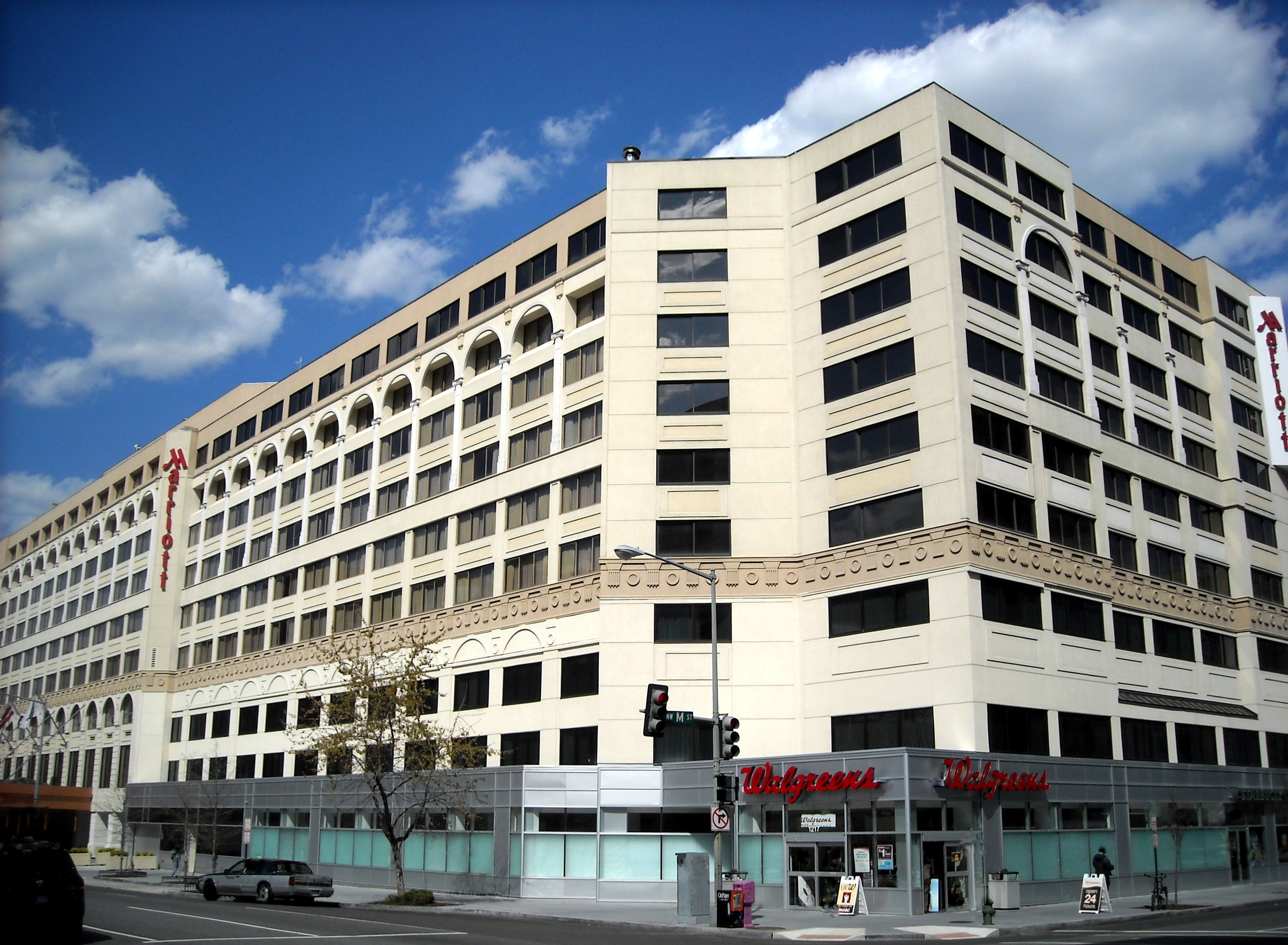
Walgreens corner store located in street-level retail space, Washington, D.C.

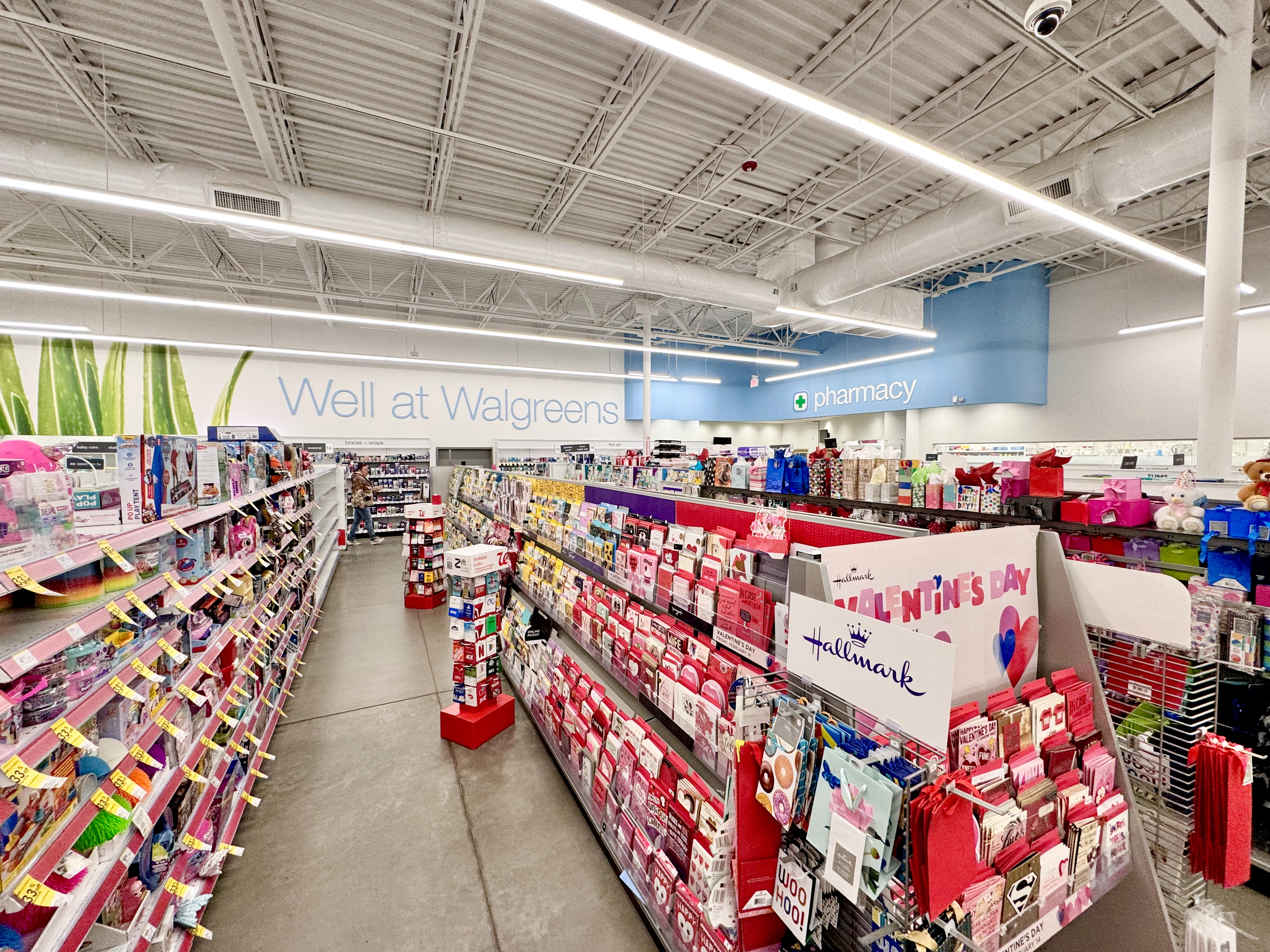
A typical Walgreens interior with greeting cards on display

Under its 2009 business model, Walgreens stores were generally freestanding corner stores, with the entrance on the street with the most traffic flow, figuratively making it a "corner drugstore" similar to how many independent pharmacies evolved. Many stores have a drive-through pharmacy. Most freestanding stores have a similar look and layout, including a bigger and more spacious layout than certain stores in major cities. Newer buildings have a more modern design than older stores. Some stores in major cities, such as New York and Chicago, have multiple floors, most notably their flagship stores. Behind the front registers are tobacco products and alcoholic beverages. Some stores do not sell these products, e.g., New Jersey stores that do not sell alcohol and Massachusetts stores that do not sell tobacco.

== Lawsuits and criticism against Walgreens ==
=== Federal billing fraud and price negotiation ===
In 2009, Walgreens threatened to leave the Medicaid program, the state and federal partnership to provide health insurance coverage to the poor, in Delaware over reimbursement rates. Walgreens was the largest pharmacy chain in the state and the only chain to make such a threat. The state of Delaware and Walgreens reached an agreement on payment rates and the crisis was averted.

In 2010, Walgreens stopped accepting Medicaid in Washington state, leaving its one million Medicaid recipients unable to use Medicaid to pay for their prescriptions filled at these 121 stores.

=== Distribution of opioids ===
In September 2012, the U.S. Drug Enforcement Administration (DEA) accused Walgreens of endangering public safety and barred the company from shipping oxycodone and other controlled drugs from its Jupiter, Florida, distribution center. The DEA said that Walgreens failed to maintain proper controls to ensure that it did not dispense drugs to addicts and drug dealers. The DEA also said that six of Walgreens' Florida pharmacies ordered in excess of one million oxycodone pills a year. In contrast, in 2011 the average pharmacy in the U.S. ordered 73,000 oxycodone tablets a year according to the DEA. One Walgreens pharmacy in Fort Myers, Florida, ordered 95,800 pills in 2009, but by 2011, this number had jumped to 2.2 million pills in one year. Another example was a Walgreens pharmacy in Hudson, Florida, a town of 34,000 people near Clearwater, that purchased 2.2 million pills in 2011, the DEA said. Immediate suspension orders are an action taken when the DEA believes a registrant, such as a pharmacy or a doctor, is "an imminent danger to the public safety." All DEA licensees "have an obligation to ensure that medications are getting into the hands of legitimate patients," said Mark Trouville, former DEA special agent in charge of the Miami Field Division. "When they choose to look the other way, patients suffer and drug dealers prosper."

The Jupiter, Florida, distribution center, which opened in 2001, is one of 12 such distribution centers owned by Walgreens. Since 2009, Walgreens' Jupiter facility has been Florida's largest distributor of oxycodone, the DEA said. Over the past three years, its market share has increased, and 52 Walgreens are among the top 100 oxycodone purchasers in the state, the DEA said.

In 2013, United States Attorney Wifredo Ferrer said Walgreens committed "an unprecedented number" of recordkeeping and dispensing violations. Walgreens was fined $80 million, the largest fine in the history of the Controlled Substances Act at that time.

In November 2021, a federal jury found that Walgreens, along with CVS and Walmart, "had substantially contributed to" the opioid crisis. The trial lasted six weeks with the jury returning a verdict finding the pharmacies liable. It was the first trial where pharmacy companies defended themselves amid the opioid epidemic.

In May 2022, Walgreens agreed to pay a settlement of $683 million to the state of Florida concerning opioid sales. Walgreens did not admit to wrongdoing as part of the settlement.

In August 2022, the state of Tennessee sued Walgreens, alleging that the pharmacy fueled the state's opioid epidemic by failing to maintain effective controls against abuse of the prescription painkiller. The lawsuit claims that Walgreens willfully flooded the market with an oversupply of prescription narcotics in violation of public nuisance and consumer protection laws.

In August 2022, a federal judge in Cleveland awarded $650 million to Lake County and Trumbull County in an opioid suit that included CVS and Walmart. Lawyers representing the counties said the companies were responsible for $3.3 billion in damages. Two other companies, Rite Aid and Giant Eagle, were also sued by the counties but settled before trial for an undisclosed amount.

In April 2025, the United States Department of Justice filed a complaint accusing Walgreens of dispensing opioids illegally for invalid prescriptions. The complaint claims that Walgreens pharmacists ignored red flags that showed that the prescriptions were invalid or did not serve a medical purpose. The complaint also alleged that the pharmacists were pressured by Walgreens to fill more prescriptions more quickly. Furthermore, Walgreens collected these illegitimate prescription fees from Medicare and other federally-funded healthcare programs. As a result, the Department of Justice has agreed to dismiss its claim in response to a settlement agreement of at least $300 million from Walgreens, and an additional $50 million if the company is transferred, merged, or sold before fiscal-year 2032.

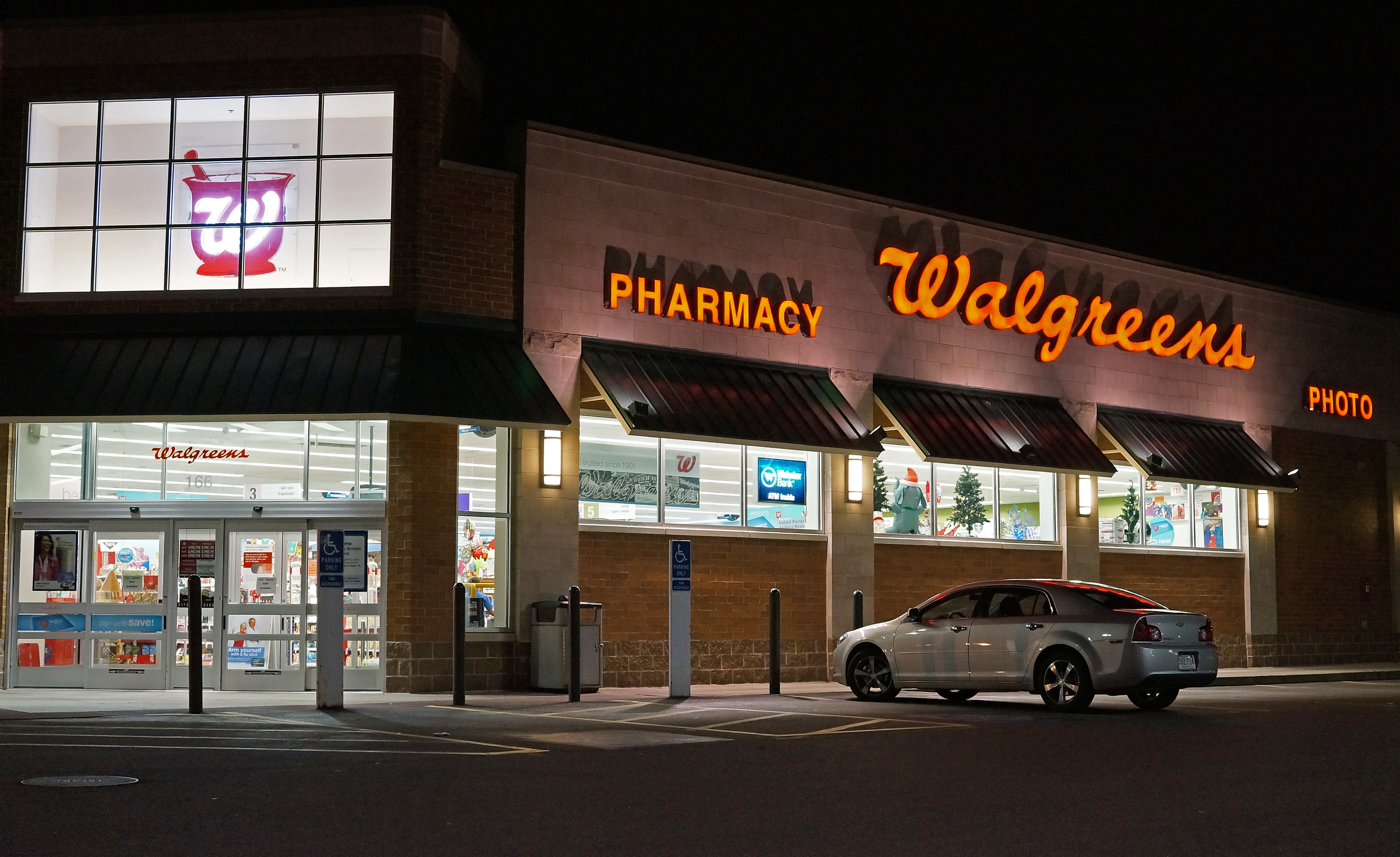
A Walgreens on Rt.1 South, Saugus, Massachusetts in 2012

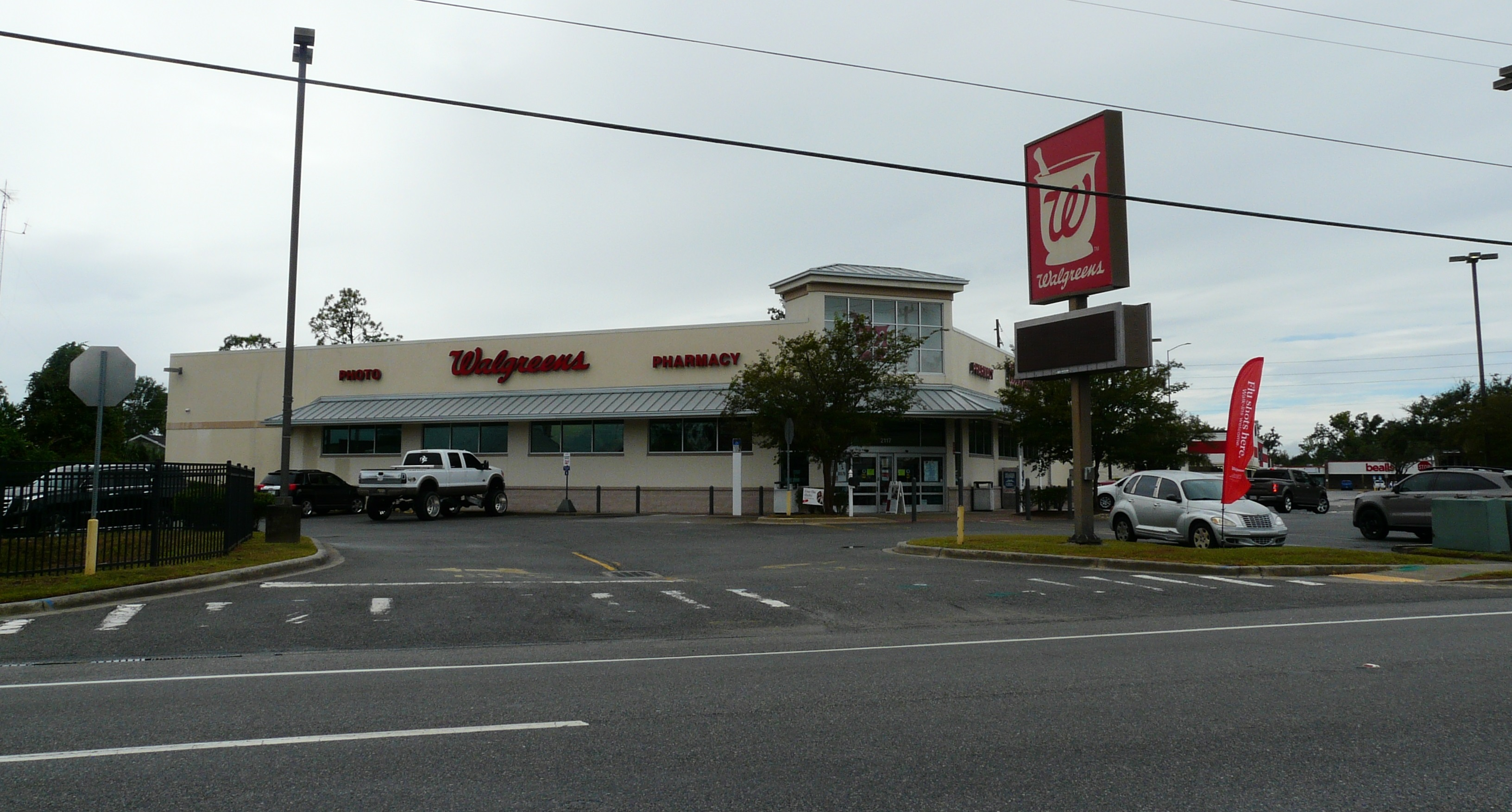
Walgreens in Perry, Florida

=== Wage theft violations ===
In March 2021, a class action against Walgreens resulted in a settlement of $4.5 million. Walgreens was accused of wage theft and labor law violations of its employees in California between 2010 and 2017, including that Walgreens "rounded down employees' hours on their timecards, required employees to pass through security checks before and after their shift without compensating them for time worked, and failed to pay premium wages to employees who were denied legally required meal breaks."

== Brands ==
List of Walgreens Boots Alliance brands
Brand	Product
Almus Pharmaceuticals	Medication
Be Jolly	Holiday
Big Roll	Toilet Paper
Botanics	Skincare
Complete Home	Household
CYO	Cosmetics
Certainty	Incontinence
Dashing	Holiday
Finest Nutrition	Vitamins
Infinitive	Electronics
Liz Earle	Skincare (UK)
Modern Expressions	Holiday
Nice!	Groceries
No. 7	Skincare
Patriot Candles	Candles
PetShoppe	Pets
Playright	Toys
Sleek MakeUP	Cosmetics
Smile & Save	Paper Towels
Soap & Glory	Cosmetics
Soltan	Sunscreen (UK)
Well at Walgreens	Healthcare
Well Beginnings	Baby
West Loop	Clothing
Wexford	Office Supplies
YourGoodSkin	Skincare

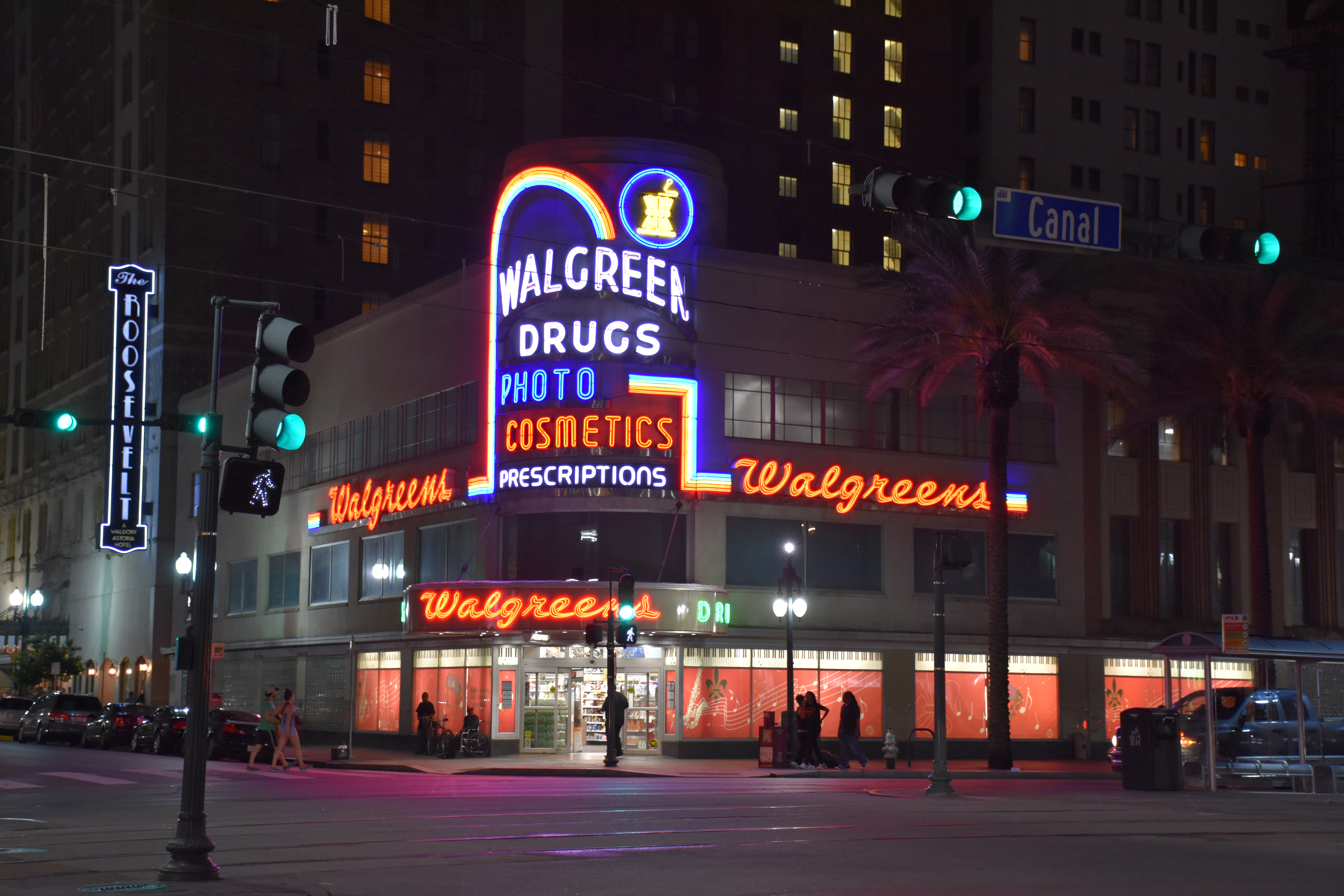
A neon-lit store on Canal Street in New Orleans in 2015
