= Reggie Fowler =

American football executive (born 1959)

No. 90
- Position: Linebacker

Personal information
- Born: February 4, 1959 (age 67); Birmingham, Alabama, U.S.
- Listed height: 6 ft 2 in (1.88 m)
- Listed weight: 220 lb (100 kg)

Career information
- High school: Sahuaro (Tucson, Arizona)
- College: Wyoming
- NFL draft: 1982: undrafted

Career history
- Cincinnati Bengals (1982)*; Arizona Wranglers (1983)
- * Offseason or practice squad member only

Career USFL statistics
- Games played: 5
- FF / FR: 0 / 1

Reginald Dennis Fowler (born February 4, 1959) is an American former football player, businessman, and convicted fraudster. He played with the Arizona Wranglers, and later invested in the Minnesota Vikings. He was involved in the Alliance of American Football. He was the owner of Spiral, Inc. and Kyrene OEM, LLC (formerly OEM Logistics, Inc.) in Tempe, Arizona.

== Early life ==
Fowler is the son of Al and Eloise Fowler, and one of their five children. When his father retired from the U.S. Air Force, he moved his family to Tucson, Arizona, where he opened a restaurant called Al's Pit Bar-B-Que. Reggie worked as a dishwasher there. The original location was to become the setting for the 1974 Martin Scorsese film, Alice Doesn't Live Here Anymore.

After Fowler's family relocated to the east side of town, he attended Magee Junior High School and later Sahuaro High School, where he played football, as did his brother, Jeff. Fowler was inducted into the Sahuaro High School Alumni (Cougar Foundation) Hall of Fame in 1998.

== Playing career ==
Fowler graduated from Sahuaro in 1977 and enrolled at Wyoming on a football scholarship. There he started out as a running back, the position he played in high school, but later switched to wide receiver and linebacker positions. He graduated in December 1981, with a bachelor's degree in Social Work. Though he was not drafted, he attended training camp for the Cincinnati Bengals but was cut from the team before the beginning of the season.

When the United States Football League (USFL) was formed in 1983, Fowler was selected to play for the Arizona Wranglers but played sparingly as a reserve linebacker. He saw action in the last six games of the 1983 season – last playing on Sunday, July 3 in Pontiac, Michigan. The Wranglers transferred the majority of their rostered players to the Chicago Blitz in September 1983; however, he was not part of the transaction and was released.

== Business career ==
Fowler took business courses at Arizona State University, then took a job with Mobil Oil's chemical division, where he worked in sales. He left that position to start Spiral in 1989, reportedly with an initial investment of only $1,000.

=== Minnesota Vikings ===
He was one of a group of investors, led by Zygmunt Wilf, who purchased the National Football League's Minnesota Vikings from previous owner Red McCombs in 2005. He initially sought to be the general partner himself, thereby becoming the first minority owner of an NFL franchise, but withdrew his bid when he could not provide details about his stake in the ownership group. Instead, he became a limited partner in the group so that he would not lose his $20 million deposit. He did not disclose any information about his financial situation to the media. By October 2014, he was no longer a limited partner of the Minnesota Vikings.

=== Alliance of American Football ===
Fowler was a major investor in the Alliance of American Football (AAF). His decision to withdraw his funding after the first week of the season forced the league to hastily sell his stake to Thomas Dundon, ultimately leading to the league's demise. League executives were neither forthright nor truthful about the state of the league's finances throughout its existence and in particular were desperate to conceal Fowler's involvement, which was only made public after the league collapsed.

=== Crypto Capital ===
In April 2019, Fowler's funds were frozen by the Department of Justice, after his indictment on charges of money laundering for cryptocurrency exchanges. Also in April 2019, New York Attorney General Letitia James filed a suit accusing cryptocurrency exchange Bitfinex of using the reserves of an affiliated company to cover up a loss of $850 million. Bitfinex had been unable to obtain a normal banking relationship, according to the lawsuit, so it deposited over $1 billion with a Panamanian payment processor known as Crypto Capital Corp. No contract was ever signed with Crypto Capital. James alleged that in 2018 Bitfinex knew or suspected that Crypto Capital had absconded with the money, but that their investors were never informed of the loss.

Fowler, who is alleged to have connections with Crypto Capital, was indicted on April 30, 2019, for running an unlicensed money-transmitting business for cryptocurrency traders. He is believed to have failed to return about $850 million to an unnamed client. Investigators also seized $14,000 in counterfeit currency from his office.

In March 2020, investors in Gerald Cotten's Quadriga filed court documents alleging Fowler played a role in the disappearance of their investment.

In April 2022, Fowler pleaded guilty to bank fraud, bank fraud conspiracy, operation of an unlicensed money transmitting business, conspiracy to operate an unlicensed money transmitting business, and wire fraud.

On Monday, June 5, 2023, Fowler was sentenced in Manhattan federal court to six years and three months in prison and was ordered to forfeit $740 million and pay restitution of $53 million.
