= Jeff Rein =

American businessman (born 1953)

- Born: 1953; New Orleans, Louisiana, United States
- Education: University of Arizona (B.S. in Accounting, 1974; B.S. in Pharmacy, 1980)
- Occupation: Business executive
- Years active: 1982–2008
- Employer: Walgreens
- Known for: Chairman and CEO of Walgreens
- Honors: Inducted into Sahuaro High School Alumni Hall of Fame (2004)

Jeff Rein (born 1953) is a former chairman and chief executive officer of Walgreens, a drug store chain in the United States.

Rein was born in New Orleans in 1953, lived in Phoenix, and came to Tucson at age 10 when his family relocated. He lived in Tucson for about 25 years. After graduating from Sahuaro High School, he enrolled at the University of Arizona (UA). He graduated from UA in accounting in 1974 and pharmacy in 1980.

Rein joined Walgreens as an assistant manager in 1982, was promoted to store manager in 1984, district manager in 1990, divisional vice president and treasurer in 1996 and vice president of marketing systems and services in 2000. Rein was appointed executive vice president of marketing in 2001 and promoted to president and chief operating officer in 2003. In 2006, he became chief executive officer and was named chairman in 2007.

In 2004, Rein was inducted into the Sahuaro High School Alumni (Cougar Foundation) Hall of Fame.
