= Boots Opticians =

British chain of optician stores

Boots Opticians Limited
- Formerly: Clement Clarke Limited (1935–1987)
- Type: Subsidiary
- Industry: Ophthalmic & dispensing opticians
- Predecessor: Clement Clarke Ltd.; Dollond & Aitchison Ltd.
- Founded: 1983
- Headquarters: Beeston, Nottingham, England
- Area served: UK
- Key people: Kyle Rowe (Managing Director)
- Products: Spectacles, contact lenses
- Revenue: ▲£235.5m (2011)
- Operating income: ▲£17.7m (2011)
- Net income: ▲£13.1m (2011)
- Owner: The Boots Group
- Number of employees: 4,156 (average full-time equiv, 2011)
- Parent: Boots UK (1987–present)
- Subsidiaries: Boots Opticians Professional Services
- Website: www.bootsopticians.com

Boots Opticians Limited operates a chain of ophthalmic and dispensing optician stores in the United Kingdom. The company is a subsidiary of The Boots Group (58%) and De Rigo (42%).

== History ==
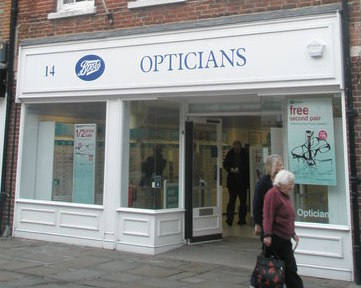
Boots Opticians branch in Chichester, West Sussex

The company began trading in the British optical retail market in 1983 in Nottingham, before opening practices in Peterborough, Leeds, Mansfield, Luton and Derby in 1984. Boots Opticians Ltd was formed as a subsidiary of Boots The Chemists Ltd in 1987, with the acquisition of Clement Clarke Ltd. and Curry and Paxton Ltd.

All of Boots Opticians' laser eye surgeries were bought by Optical Express in late 2004.

On 29 January 2009, it was announced that Boots Opticians were to merge with Dollond & Aitchison, forming a chain of 690 stores and 5,000 staff after Boots purchased a controlling share in D&A. In May 2019, the company was reported to be considering closing more than 200 stores within two years.

As of 2020 there were around 630 stores, 180 of them operated by franchisees. Amid falling sales during the COVID-19 pandemic, plans to close 48 stores were announced in July 2020.

== Misconduct case ==
In February 2019, the General Optical Council (GOC), the regulator for the optical professions in the UK, imposed a fine of £50,000 – the maximum allowed – on Boots Opticians Professional Services Ltd for mishandling a whistleblower case. In 2014, an optometrist employed by Boots had uncovered deficiencies in earlier work of another employee, affecting several patients, and Boots management had not responded appropriately. The GOC ruled that the company's fitness to carry on business was "impaired by reason of misconduct".

== See also ==
- Boots UK
