= Farmacias Benavides =

Mexican pharmacy chain

Farmacias Benavides S.A. de C.V.

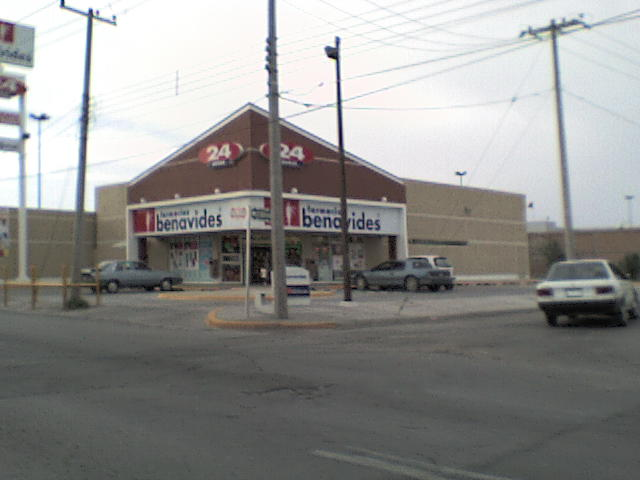
- Benavides Allende in Torreón
- Formerly: Botica del Carmen
- Type: Subsidiary
- Founded: 1917; 109 years ago in Monterrey, Mexico
- Parent: The Boots Group

Farmacias Benavides S.A. de C.V. is a Mexican drugstore chain.

It was founded in 1917, in Monterrey, Mexico, and is owned by Sycamore Partners through The Boots Group. Farmacias Benavides has since returned to financial health, and is now opening new locations throughout the region.

It began operations as Botica del Carmen in Monterrey, and opened its first drugstores in 1940 in this same city. It grew over the next 60 years to have over 1,300 drugstores throughout northern and western Mexico.

In 1996, it was Mexico's largest pharmacy chain.

== Gallery ==
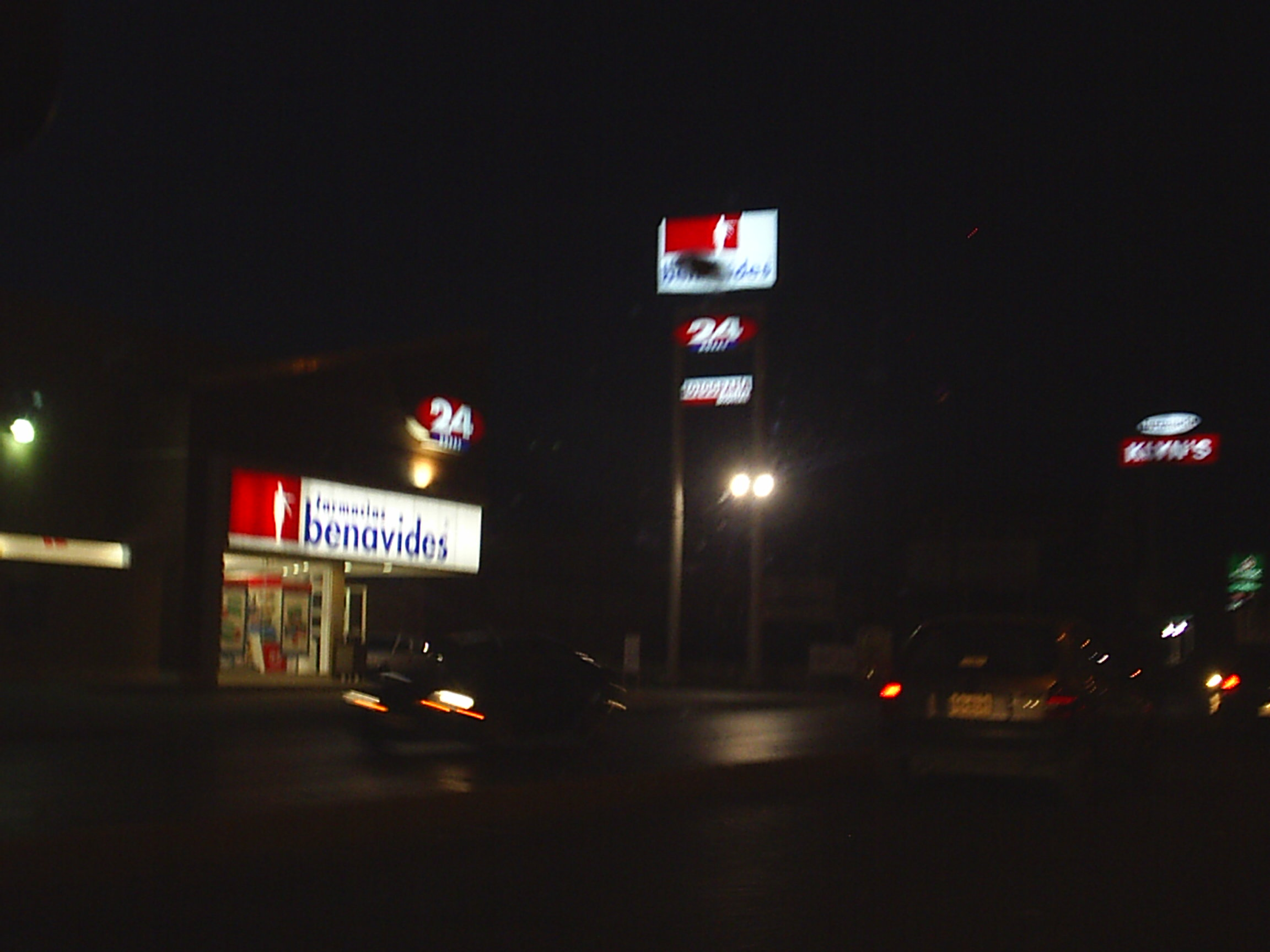
Benavides Saltillo 400 in Torreon (currently closed)

Logo used before the adquiscition by Farmacias Ahumada, S.A.
