= Stefano Pessina =

Italian billionaire businessman (born 1941)

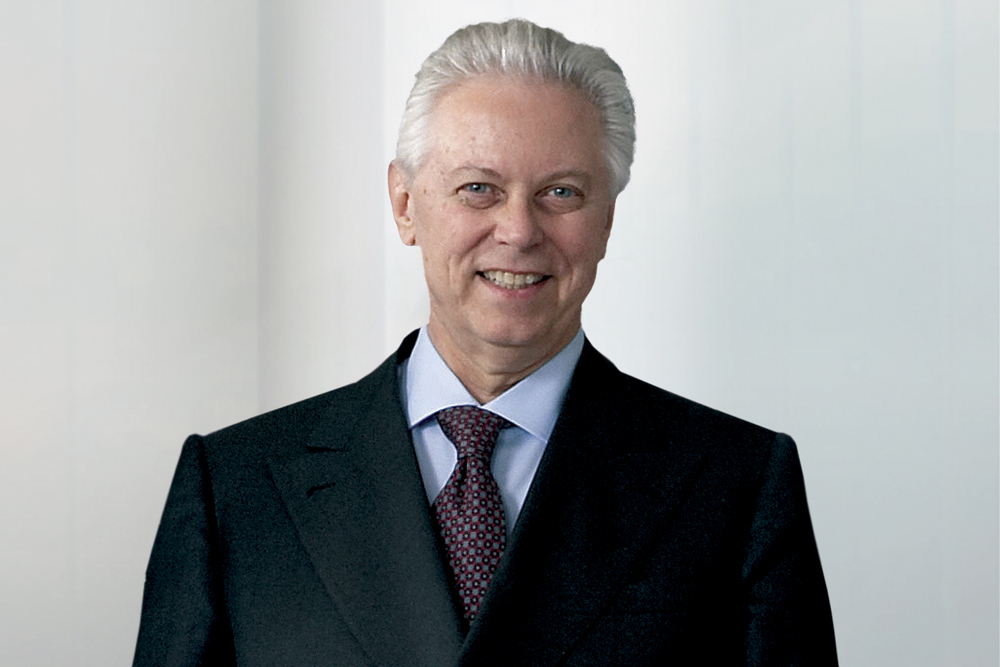
- Pessina in 2010
- Born: 4 June 1941 (age 85); Pescara, Italy
- Education: Polytechnic University of Milan (BS)
- Term: 2025–present
- Spouses: Barbara Pessina (divorced); Ornella Barra
- Children: 2

Stefano Pessina (born 4 June 1941) is an Italian-Monegasque billionaire businessman; he was the executive chairman of Walgreens Boots Alliance until its acquisition by Sycamore Partners in 2025.

== Early life ==
Pessina was born in Pescara and grew up between Milan, Como, and Naples. He graduated from the Polytechnic University of Milan in nuclear engineering before starting his career in academia and later joining market research firm ACNielsen in Milan. He wanted to be a nuclear physicist but was discouraged by the tumultuous political climate of the 1970s.

== Career ==
In 1977, Pessina took over his family's pharmaceutical wholesaler in Naples, founding Alleanza Farmaceutica. Following the merger with Ornella Barra's Di Farma, they founded Alleanza Salute (1986), which then became Alliance Santé (1988), a Franco-Italian pharmaceutical wholesale group. In 1997, it merged with UniChem to become Alliance UniChem. From 2001 to 2004, he was its CEO. He was deputy chairman, and later chairman. The company merged with Boots in 2006 and was taken private in July 2007. Pessina was chairman of Alliance Boots from 2007 to 2014, and was executive chairman of Walgreens Boots Alliance (WBA). He is a director of the Consumer Goods Forum. In July 2020, it was announced that Pessina would step down as CEO of WBA to take a less hands on role and replace Jim Skinner as executive chairman.

== Controversies ==
In a 31 January 2015 interview for The Sunday Telegraph, Pessina commented on the prospect of Britain's Labour Party winning the 2015 United Kingdom general election in May, saying "it would be a catastrophe" and describing the Labour's business policies as "not helpful", but declining to specify which policies he disliked. Labour Party figures criticized Pessina's comments, with Shadow Business Secretary Chuka Umunna responding "The British people and British businesses will draw their own conclusions when those who don't live here, don't pay tax in this country and lead firms that reportedly avoid making a fair contribution in what they pay purport to know what is in Britain’s best interest," followed by Labour Party leader Ed Miliband saying "The chairman of Boots lives in Monaco and doesn't pay British taxes ... I don't think people should take kindly to being told how to vote by someone who avoids paying his taxes." Walgreens Boots Alliance responded that Pessina's comments "have been taken out of context ... Stefano Pessina was expressing his personal views only and is not campaigning against Ed Miliband or the Labour Party."

== Personal life ==
Pessina is married to Ornella Barra; she was chief operating officer, international of Walgreens Boots Alliance. He was previously married to Barbara. They had two children. According to Bloomberg Billionaires Index, Pessina's net worth was estimated at US$6.7 billion as of October 2024.

== Awards and honours ==
- 2013, Grand Official of the Order of the Star of Italy.
- 2016, Special Achievements Award in Business by the National Italian American Foundation (NIAF).
- 2017, Golden Plate Award of the American Academy of Achievement.
- 2018, World Retail Hall of Fame.
