= Foreman-Case House =

Historic house in Indiana, United States

- U.S. National Register of Historic Places
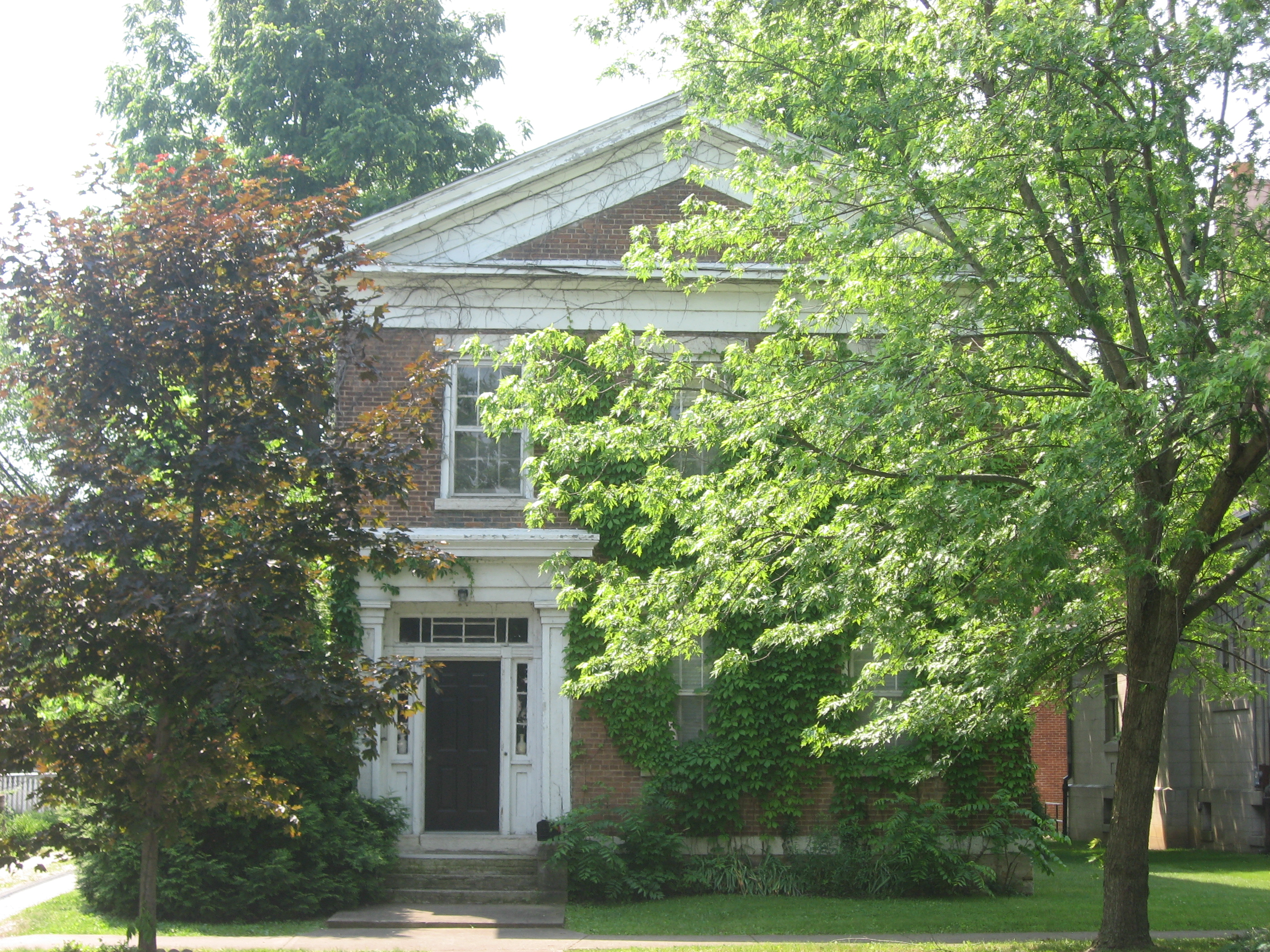
- Foreman-Case House, June 2011

- Location within Carroll County, Indiana Location within Indiana Location within the United States
- Location: 312 E. Main St., Delphi, Indiana
- Coordinates: 40°35′12″N 86°40′15″W
- Area: less than one acre
- Built: c. 1851
- Architectural style: Greek Revival
- NRHP reference No.: 90000811
- Added to NRHP: May 24, 1990

Foreman-Case House, also known as the Foreman-Case-Schermerhorn House, is a historic home located at Delphi, Indiana, United States. It was built about 1851, and is a two-story, Greek Revival style red brick dwelling with a front gable roof. It has a two-story, hip roofed rear section, with a brick first story and frame second story.

It was listed on the National Register of Historic Places in 1990.
