= Delphi Courthouse Square Historic District =

Historic district in Indiana, United States

- U.S. National Register of Historic Places
- U.S. Historic district
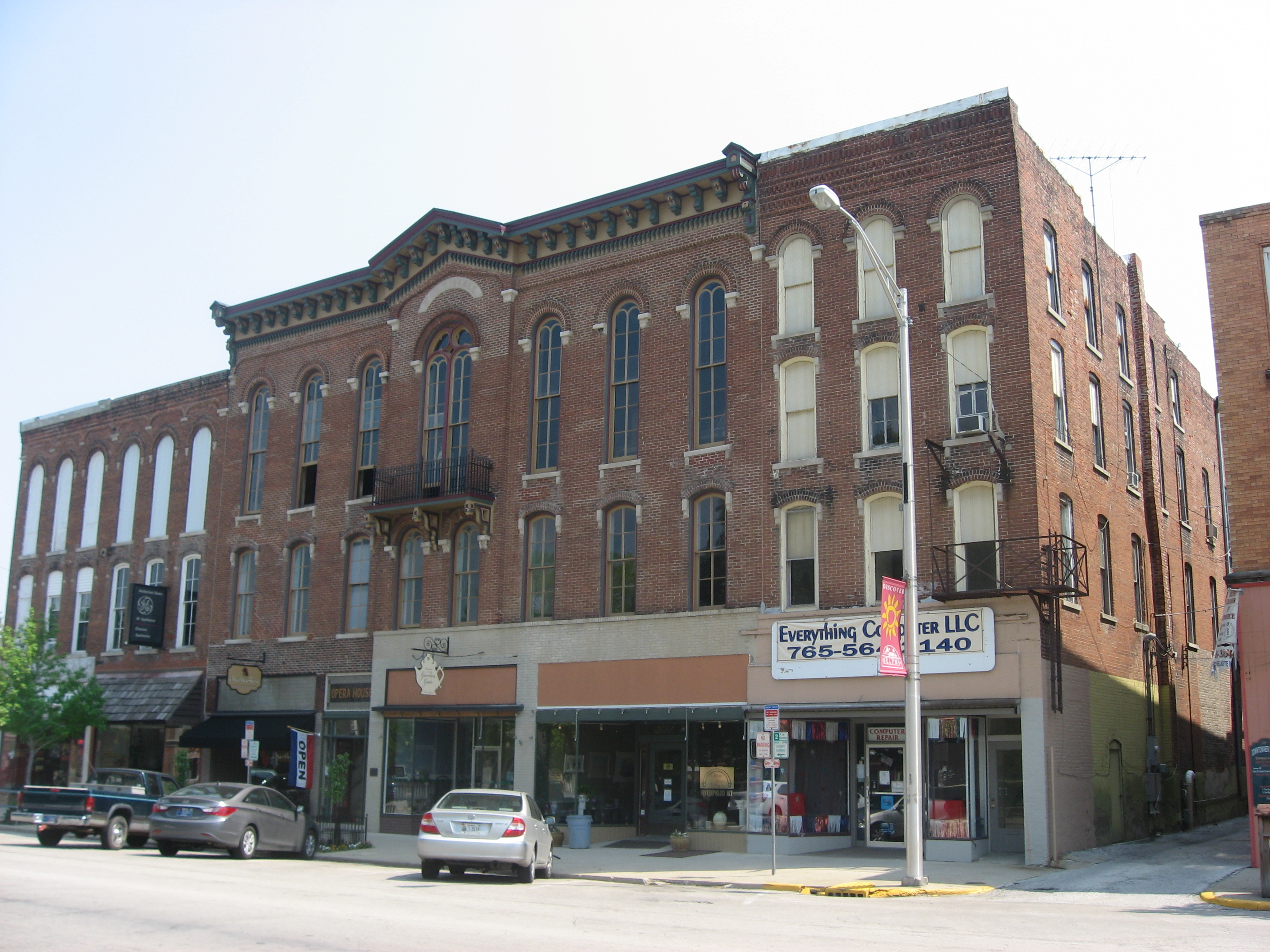
- Buildings on the eastern side of the square

- Location within Carroll County, Indiana Location within Indiana Location within the United States
- Location: Roughly bounded by Monroe, s. side of Main, w. side of Market and Indiana Sts., Delphi, Indiana
- Coordinates: 40°35′11″N 86°40′29″W
- Area: 23 acres (9.3 ha)
- Architect: Dunlap, Elmer; et al.
- Architectural style: Italianate, Classical Revival
- NRHP reference No.: 10000120
- Added to NRHP: March 31, 2010

The Delphi Courthouse Square Historic District in Delphi, Indiana is a 23-acre (9.3 ha) area roughly bounded by Monroe, Main, Market and Indiana Streets. It was listed on the National Register of Historic Places in 2010. It includes Italianate architecture and Classical Revival architecture and work by Elmer Dunlap among its 31 contributing buildings.

William Wilson donated 100 acres (40 ha) along Deer Creek for the town. The Indian mill sites located along the Creek made this a valuable site. Samuel Milroy lead the effort to make Delphi the county seat in May 1828. The nearby swamps meant that malaria, as endemic and the town grew slowly. The first permanent settler on record was Henry Robinson. With help from his family, the first log cabin was erected January 8, 1825, just south of Deer Creek on what is now known as "the hill" (later referred to as Robinson's hill). Daniel Baum and family also established their cabin on "Robinson's hill" where they started the first tavern "inn" that was frequented by settlers that passed through via the Indiana trail, which crossed Deer Creek just below their cabin.

The Wabash River, located north and west of Delphi, provided an excellent travel route for early settlers. Thus Delphi received its initial thrust under leadership when French Canadian traders from the north and settlers from Ohio and Kentucky came to this area to obtain possession of land and trade on the Wabash River. Ephraim Chamberlain purchased the first land in this township on February 17, 1824.

In 1826, the Wabash and Erie Canal opened trade to the east and southwest. The town experienced new growth. With the advent of rail transportation, the canal was put out of business with the boat in 1850, lost when the aqueduct over Deer Creek collapsed. The railroad arrived in Delphi in 1856. The railroad systems, which passed through Delphi, were the Norfolk and Western, Monon, and the Louisville and Nashville Railroad. The Fort Wayne-Wabash traction interurban line passed through Delphi in 1904. The interurban end when the motorbus was introduced.

== Significant buildings ==
All structures are historically contributing towards the Historic District Status, unless otherwise noted. An ‘O’ rating signifies that the structure had enough historic or architectural significance to be considered for individual listing in the National Register of Historic Places. The ‘N’ rating signifies that the structure is above average and may, with further investigation be eligible for an individual listing. The ‘R’ or contributing rating signifies that the structure meet the basic inventory qualifications, but fails to meet individual merit, but in combination with other closely placed similar structures warrants inclusion in an historic district.

West Monroe St

- 100 Block - House; Carpenter/Builder, c.1885 (N)
- 100 Block - Old Jail Out Building; Primitive, c.1865 (R)
- 118 - House; Queen Anne, c. 1885 (O)

East Monroe St

- 216 - House; Greek Revival; c.1855 (N)
- 222 - House; Italianate, c.1870 (N)

West Franklin St

- 010 - Commercial Building; Italianate, c.1855 (O)
- 115 - Ives Building; Italianate, c.1885 (O)

East Franklin St

- 114 - Commercial Building; Italianate, c.1895 (N)
- 201 - RUFFIN-ROBINSON House; Queen Anne, c.1887 (O)
- 217 - ATKINSON-AFFLIS House; Classic, c.1895 (N)

West Main St

- 101 - Carroll County Courthouse NR
- 104 - Commercial Building; Italianate, c.1870 (O)
- 106 - Commercial Building; Italianate, c.1870 (O)
- 108 - Commercial Building; Italianate, c.1870 (O)
- 112 - Holt-Rinehart Commercial Building; Italianate, c.1857 (O)
- 116 - Commercial Building; Queen Anne, c.1885 (N)
- 202 - Commercial Building; Italianate, c.1875 (N)

East Mains St

- 100 block - Fire Station; Romanesque, c.1920 (N)
- 102 – Odd Fellows Commercial Building; Second Empire, 1881 (O)
- 106 - Commercial Building; 19th Century Functional, c.1895 (N)
- 107- 109 - I.O.O.F. Commercial Building; Victorian Renaissance, 1874 (O)
- 111 - Bradshaw Commercial Building; Italianate, c.880 (N)
- n/a - Commercial Building; Italianate, c.1870 (N)
- 112 – Dimmick Wollver Commercial Building; Italianate, c.1865 (O)
- 113-115 – Carl Brother's Block Commercial Building; Italianate, 1876 (O)
- 116 - Commercial Building; 19th Century Functional, c.1900 (N)
- 117 - Commercial Building; Victorian Renaissance, c.1875 (O)
- 123 - A.T. Bowen Bank Commercial Building; Italianate; c.1840 (O)
- 124 – Niewerth Commercial Building; Italianate; 1874 (O) NR
- 222 – Library; Neo-Classic, c.1905 (O)
- 302 - First Presbyterian Church; Neo-Gothic, 1909 (N)

South Washington St

- 101-103 - Margowski Commercial Building; Italianate, c.1880 (N)
- 105-107 – Old City Hall-Opera House NR
  - 109 - Commercial Building; Italianate, 1864 (O)
- 111 - Commercial Building; Italianate, c.1870 (N)
- 120 - Gas Station Commercial Building; English Domestic, c.1920 (O)
- 119 - Commercial Building; Italianate, c.1880 (O)
- 210-212 – Lathrop-Kerlin Commercial Building; Queen Anne, c.1880 (O)
- 213 - Commercial Building; Romanesque, c.1890 (N)
- 215 – Masonic Temple (Delphi); Italianate, c.1875 (O)
- N.A. - Courthouse; Renaissance Revival, 1917 (O)
- 403 - Commercial Building; Italianate, c.1876 (N)

South Indiana St

- 213 - First Presbyterian Church Office;Free Classic, 1895 (N)
- 219 – Smith-Darragh House, Greek Revival, 1840 (O)

North Indiana St

- 322 - House; Carpenter/Builder, c.1890 (N)
- 610 - House; Carpenter/Builder, 1850 (N)
- 712 - Gros House; Italianate, c.1860 (0)

South Union St

- 105 - House; Italianate, c.1875 (N)
- N.A. - House; Italianate, c1830/C.1875 (N)
- 219 – Dougan-Davis House; Italianate, c.1865 (O)

North Market St

- 121 – Griffin-Mullin House; Italianate, c.1855 (N)
- 205 – Margowski House; Gothic Revival, 1865 (N)

== Gallery ==
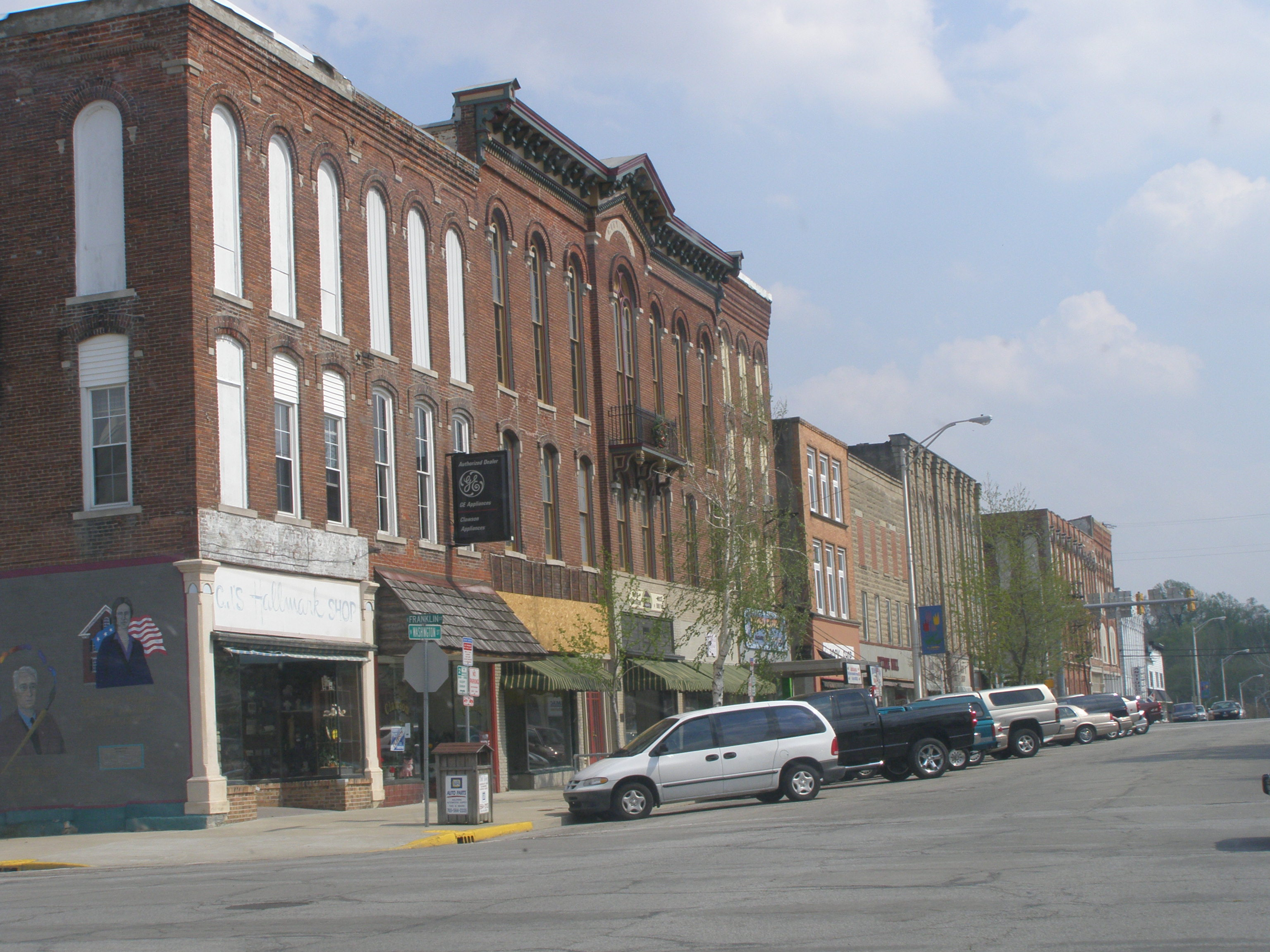
Margowski Commercial Building, Old City Hall & Opera house

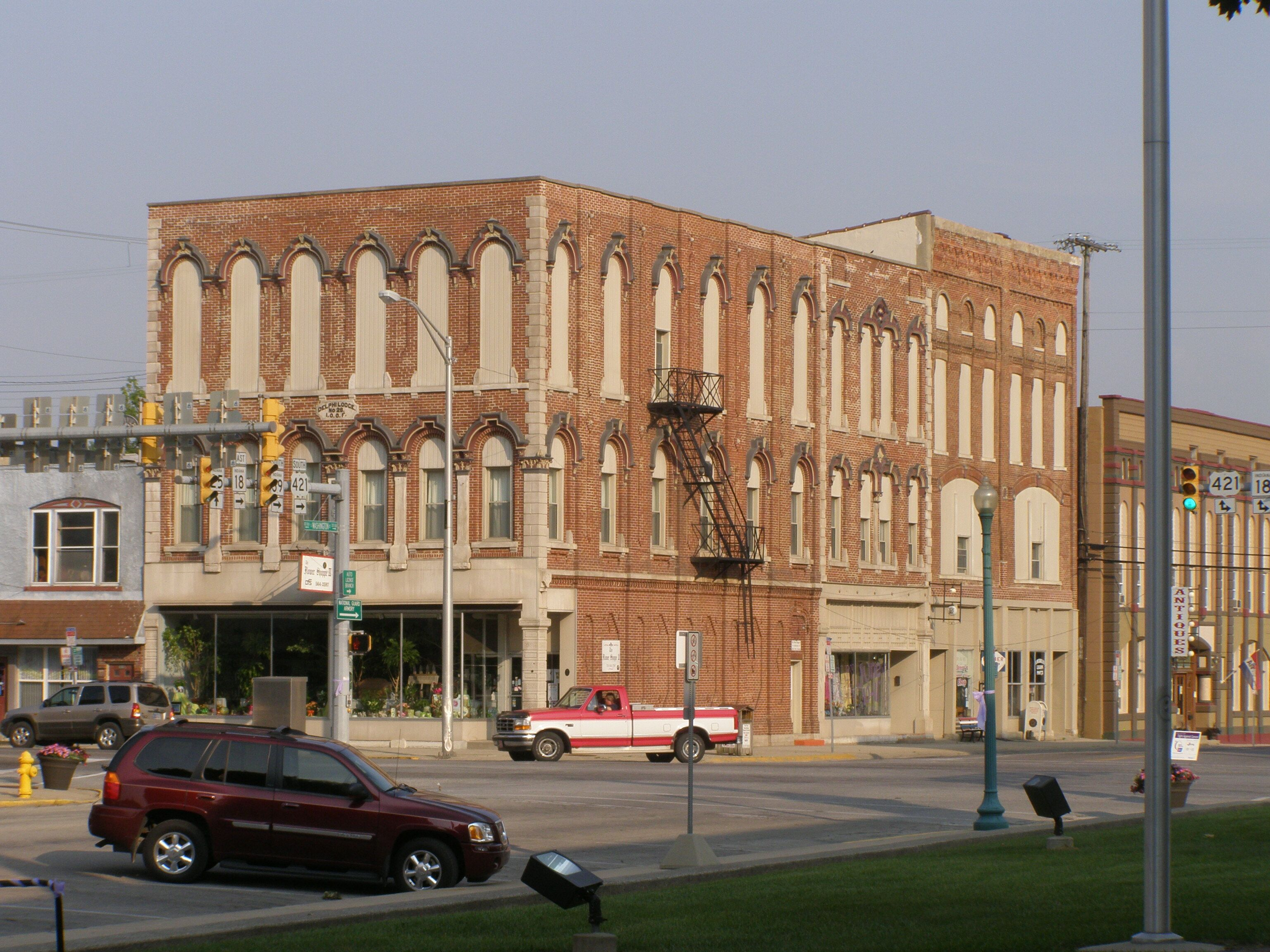
102 E Main - IOOF Commercial Building (1874)

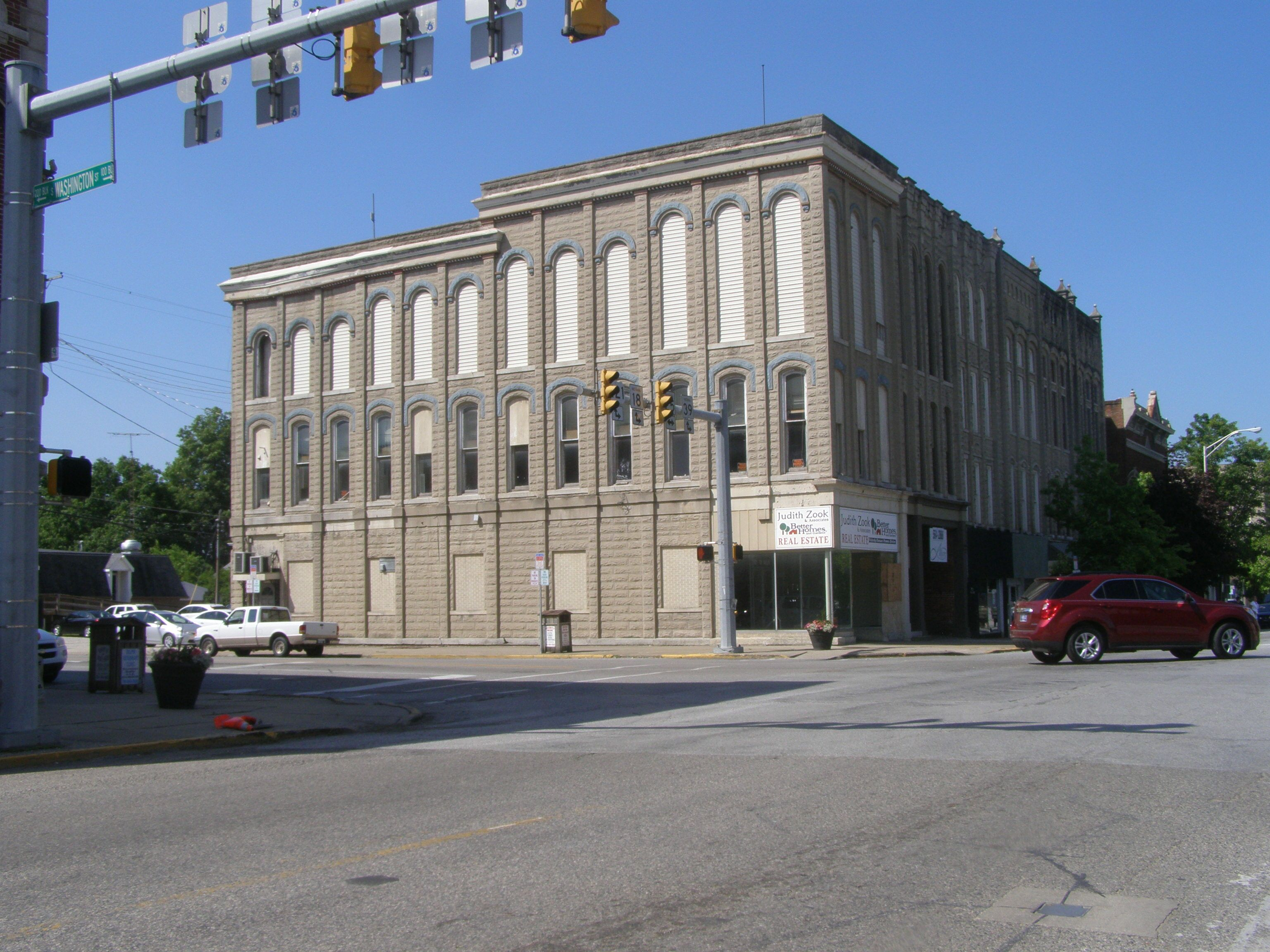
107 E Main – IOOF (1881)

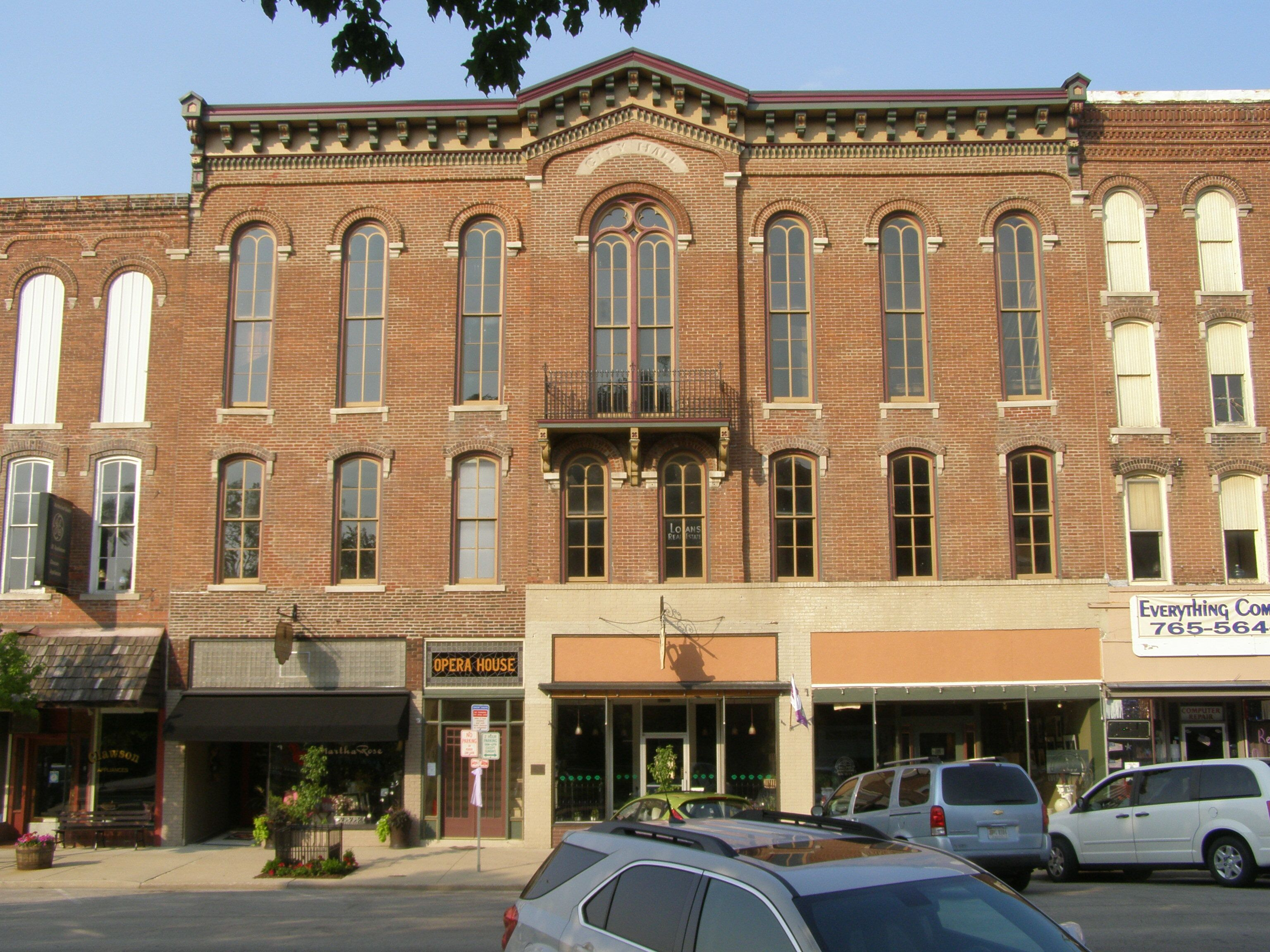
Old City Hall and Opera House

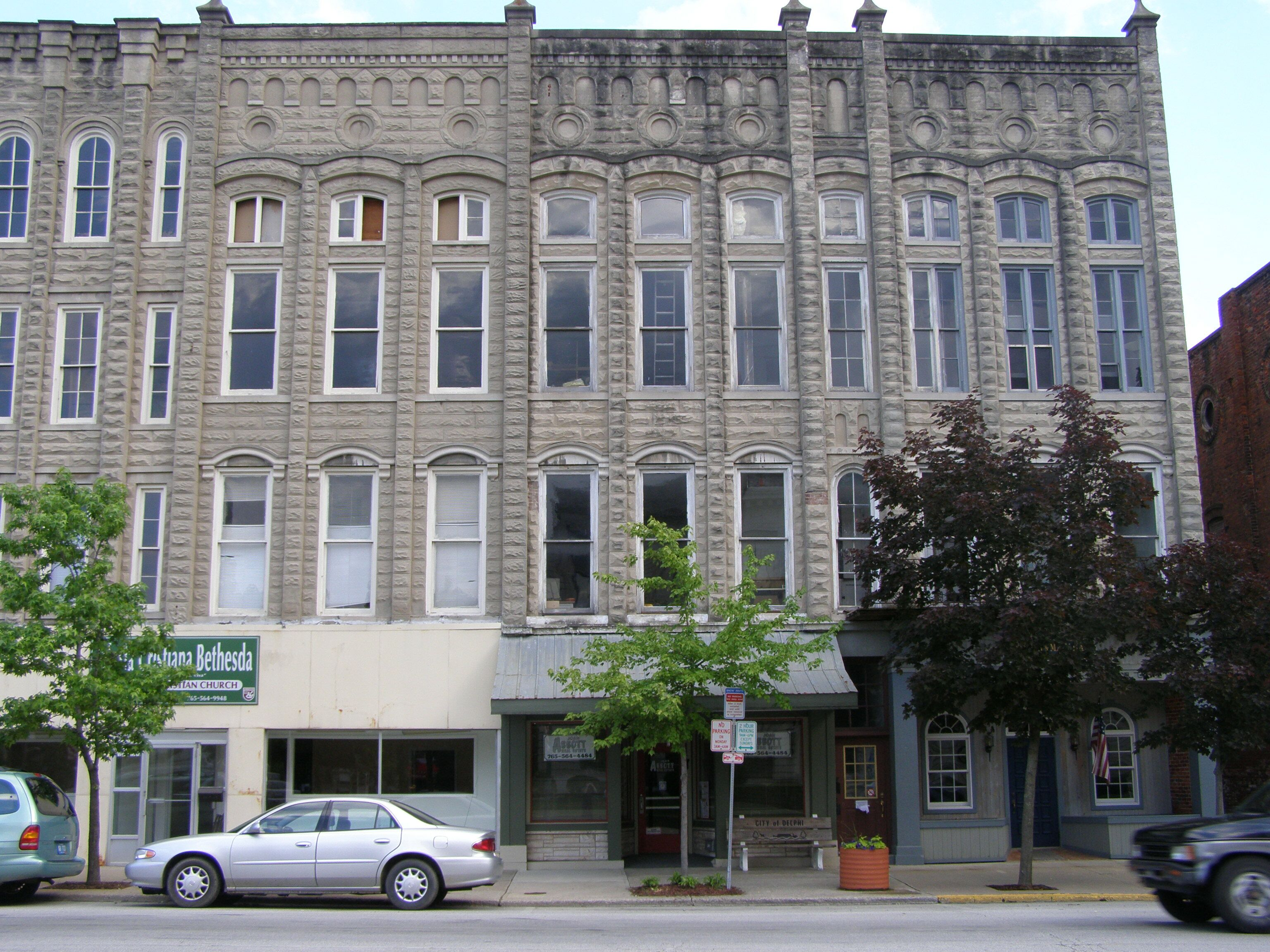
Bradshaw & Rhinehart Commercial Bldgs

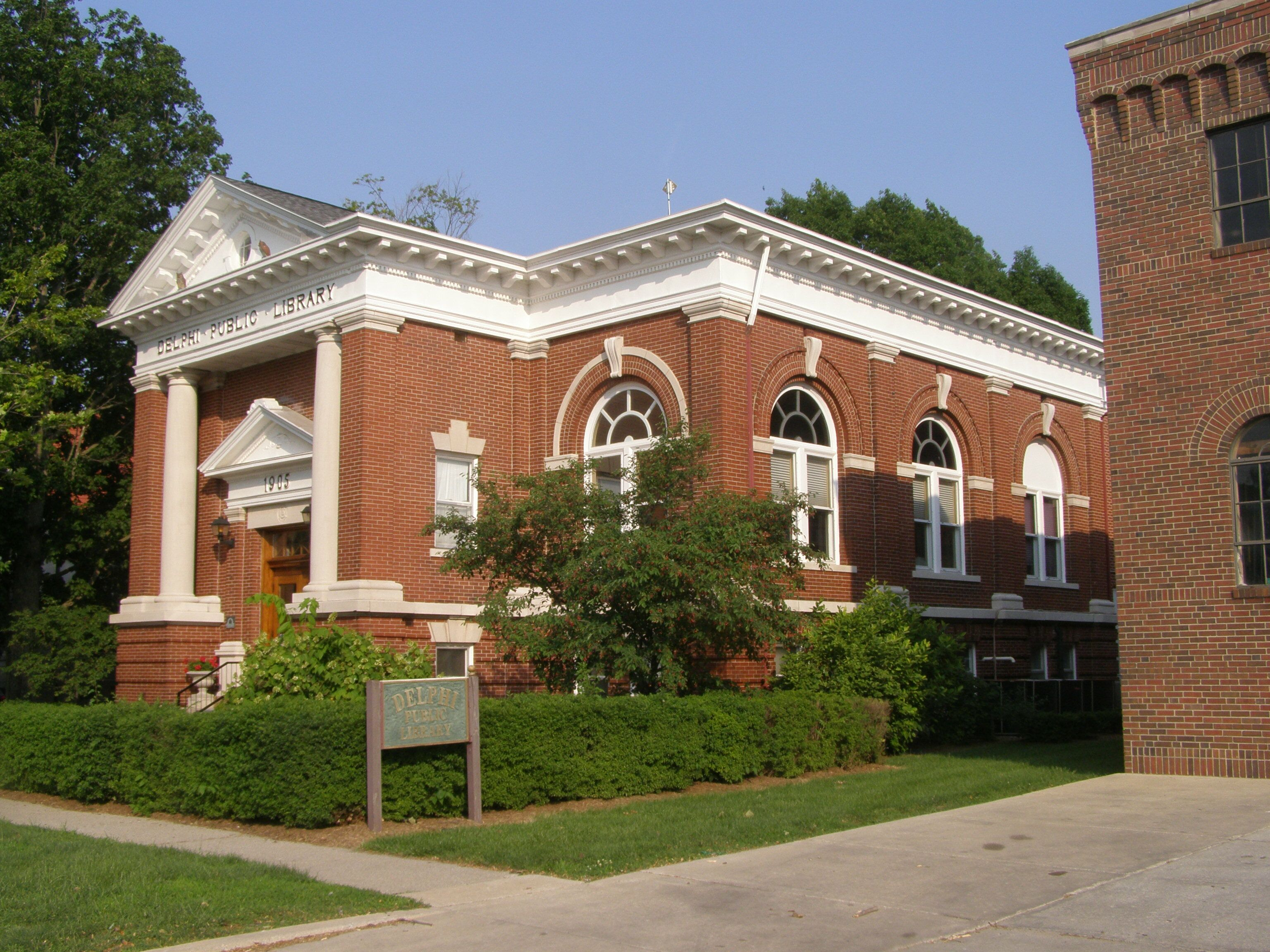
Public Library

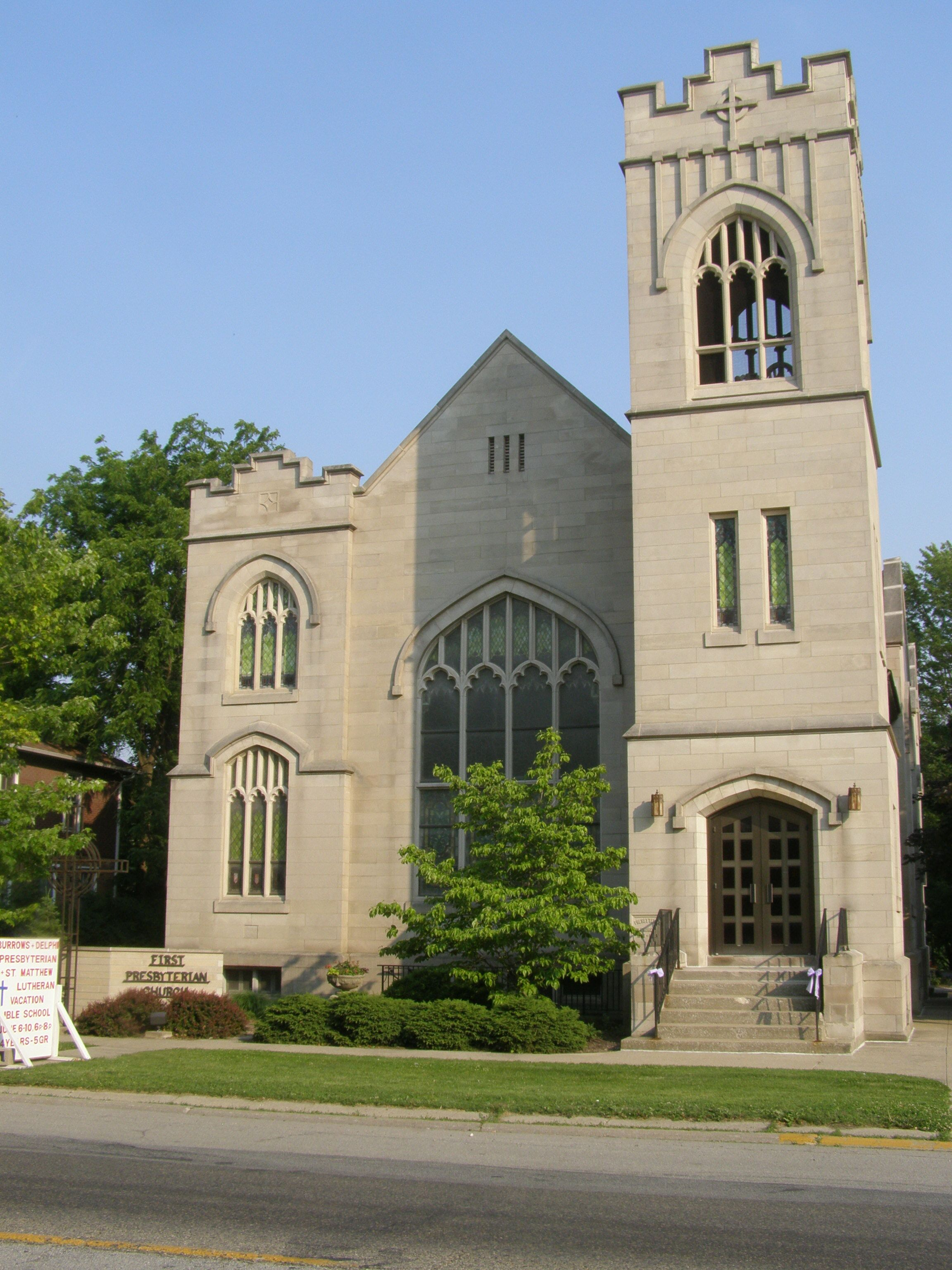
First Presbyterian Church

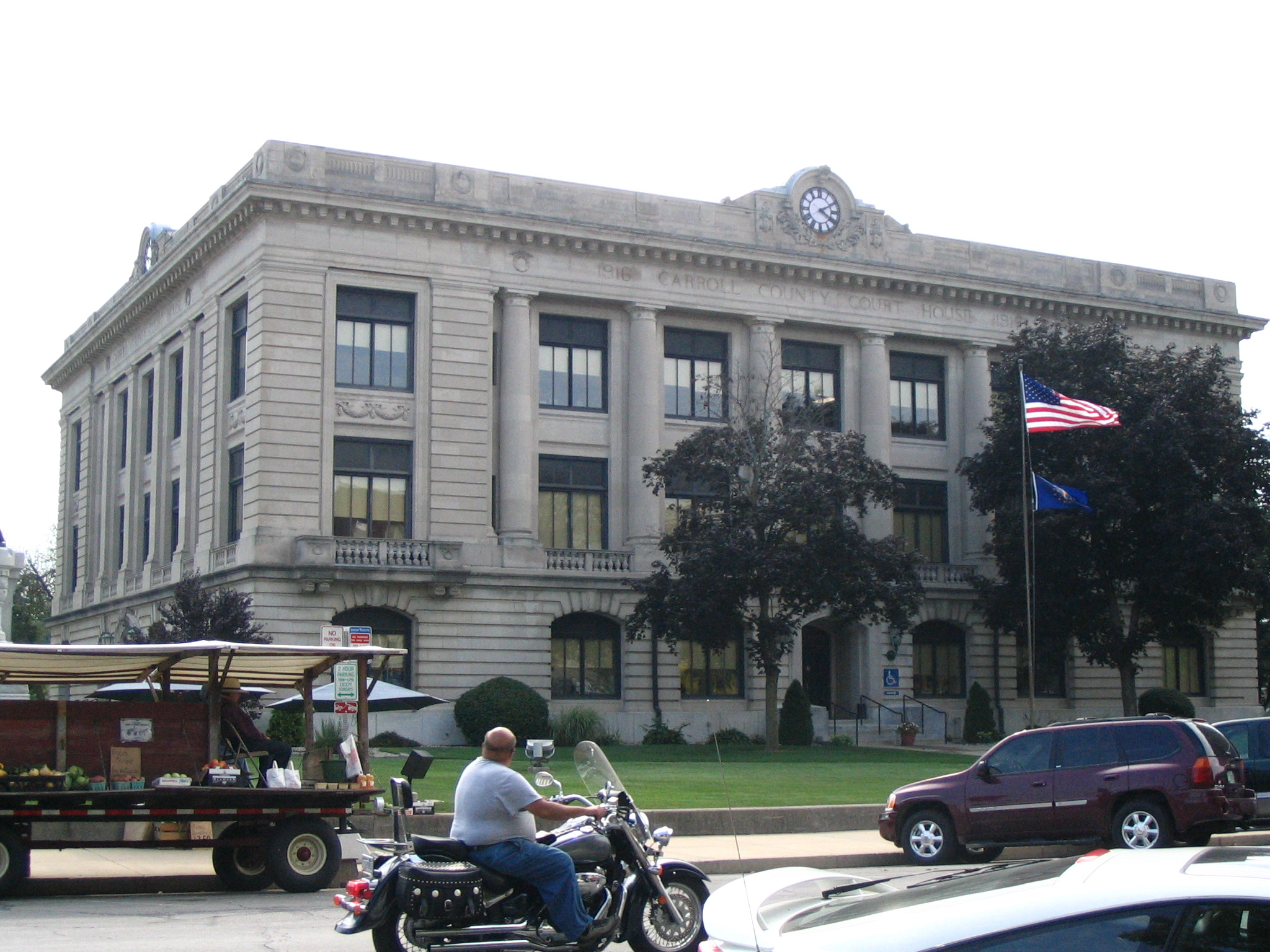
Carroll County Courthouse

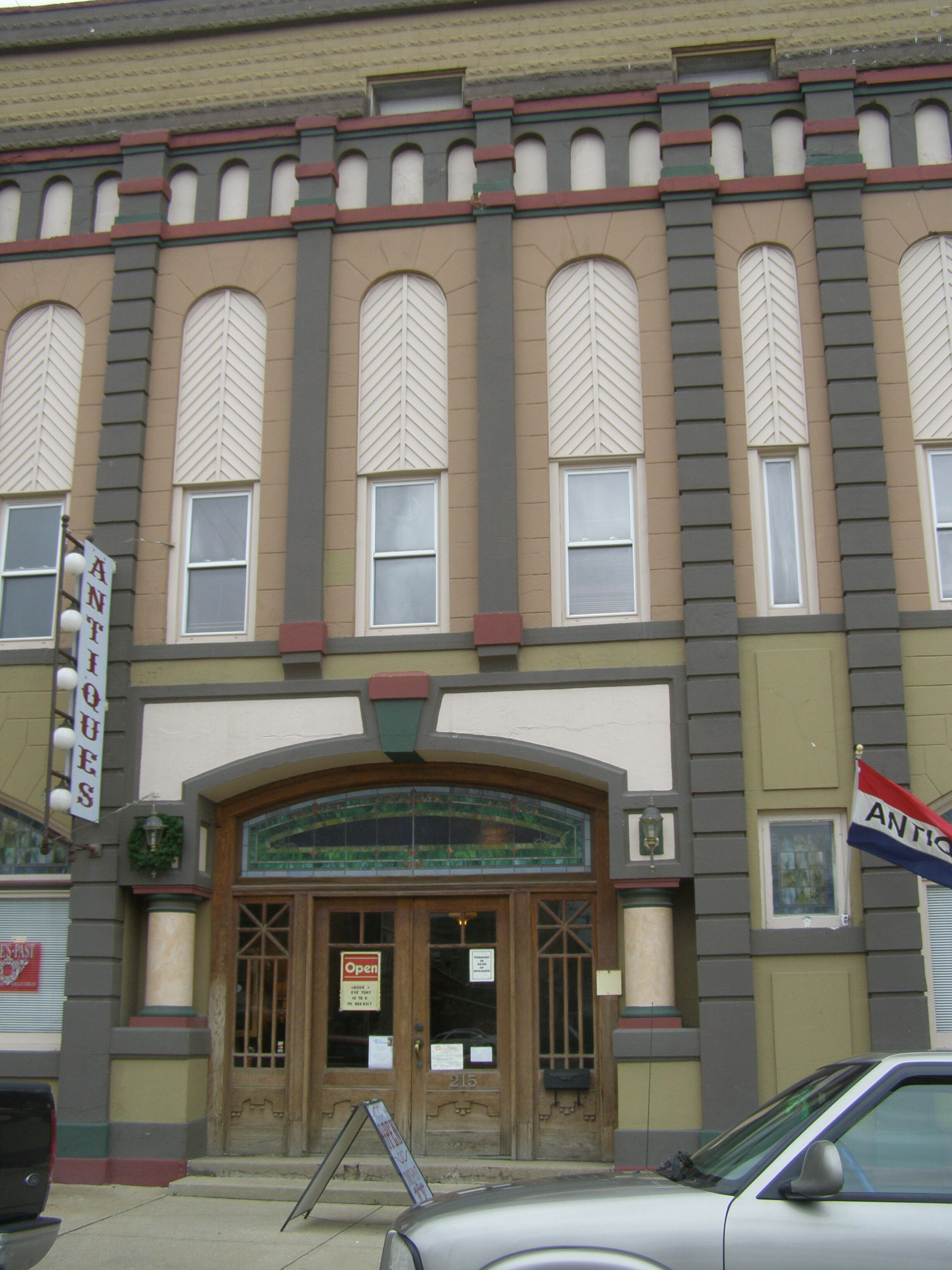
Masonic Temple
