= Delphi, Indiana =

- City
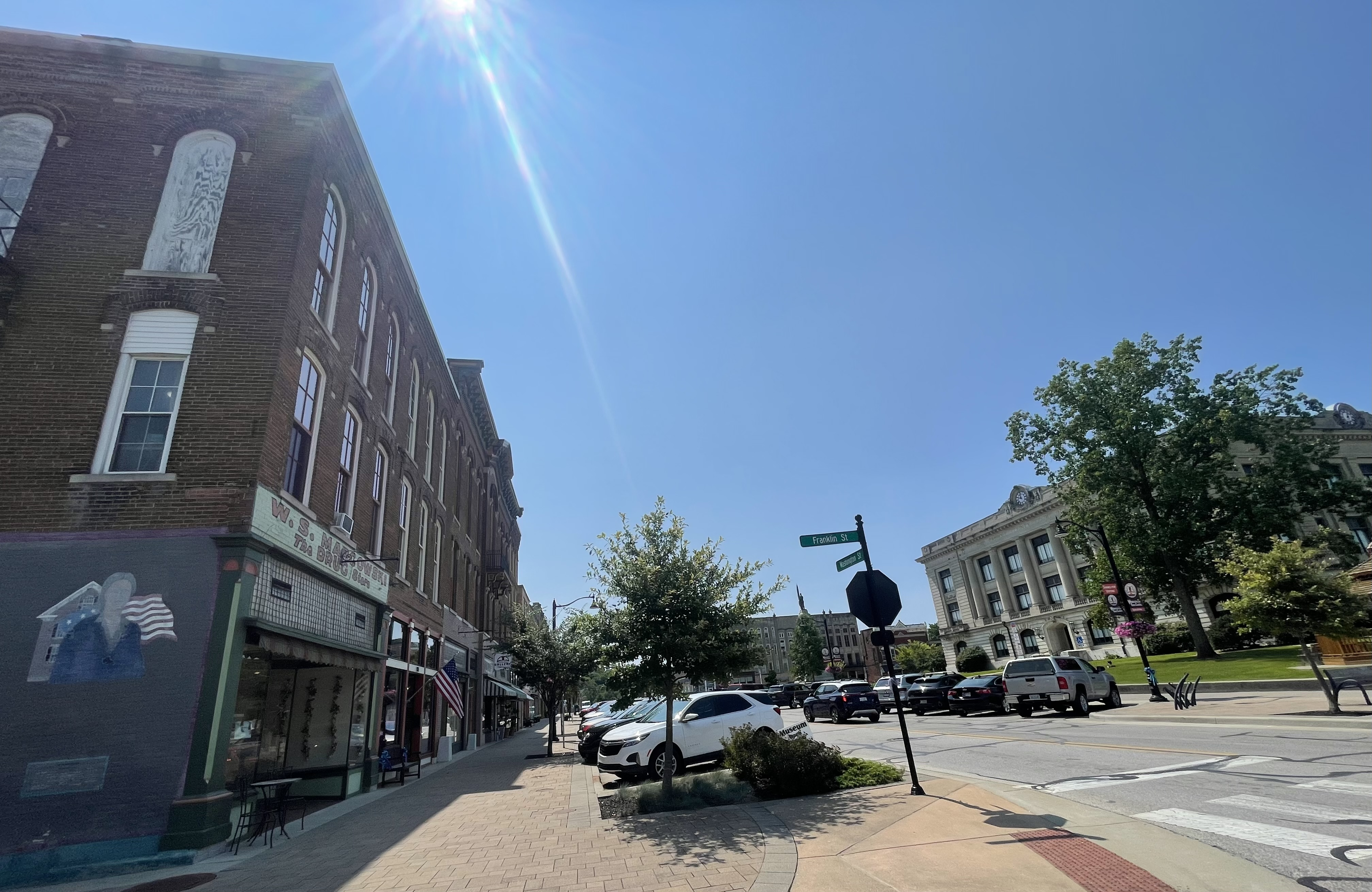
- Center of downtown Delphi

- Logo
- Motto: "Home of the Wabash and Erie Canal"
- Location of Delphi in Carroll County, Indiana.
- Coordinates: 40°35′00″N 86°40′01″W
- Country: United States
- State: Indiana
- County: Carroll
- Township: Deer Creek

Government
  - Mayor: Kamron Yates (R)

Area
  - Total: 2.71 sq mi (7.03 km^{2})
  - Land: 2.71 sq mi (7.03 km^{2})
  - Water: 0 sq mi (0.00 km^{2})
- Elevation: 617 ft (188 m)

Population (2020)
  - Total: 2,961
  - Density: 1,091/sq mi (421.1/km^{2})
- Time zone: UTC-5 (EST)
  - Summer (DST): UTC-4 (EDT)
- ZIP code: 46923
- Area code: 765
- FIPS code: 18-17614
- GNIS feature ID: 2394507
- Website: cityofdelphi.in.gov

Delphi (/ˈdɛlfaɪ/) is a city in and the county seat of Carroll County, in the U.S. state of Indiana. Located twenty minutes northeast of Lafayette, it is part of the Lafayette, Indiana Metropolitan Statistical Area. The population was 2,961 at the 2020 census.

== History ==
Delphi was platted in 1828. It took its name from the ancient city of Delphi, in Greece. Several months after Delphi was founded, it was designated as the county seat.

The Barnett-Seawright-Wilson House, Carroll County Courthouse, Delphi City Hall, Delphi Courthouse Square Historic District, Delphi Methodist Episcopal Church, Foreman-Case House, and Niewerth Building are listed on the National Register of Historic Places.

Local heritage centers on the Wabash and Erie Canal, a canal and towpath that once bound together northern, central, and southern Indiana. The segment of the canal that passes through Delphi has been rewatered and serves as the focus of canal activities. A visitor center and museum, the Wabash & Erie Canal Interpretive Center, welcomes guests.

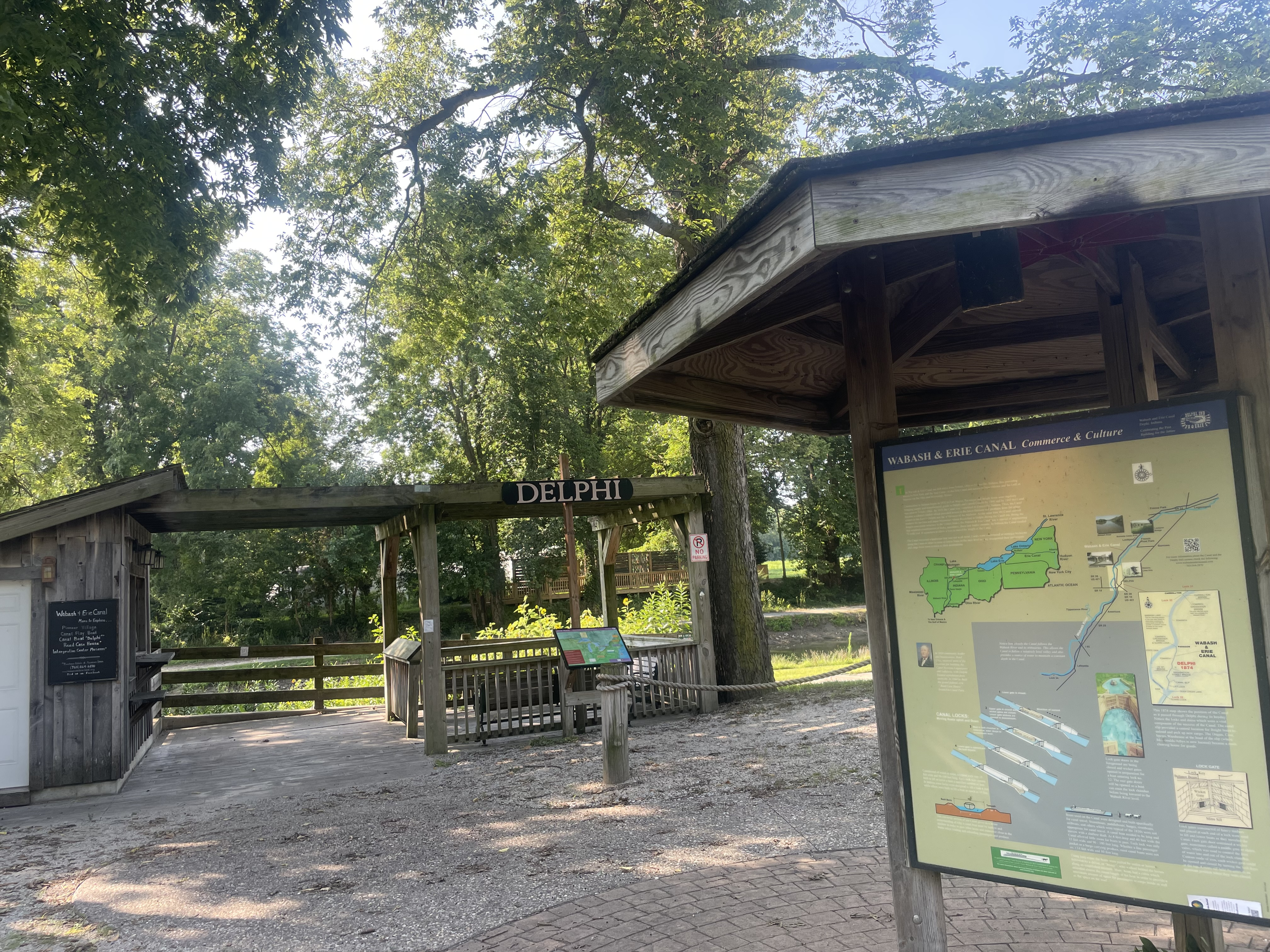
Numerous infographic signs at the Interpretive Center detail the engineering and life around the canals, which once carried a variety of goods, culture, and people from the east into rural frontier land

== Geography ==
According to the 2010 census, Delphi has a total area of 2.73 square miles (7.07 km^{2}), all land.

== Demographics ==
Historical population
Census	Pop.	Note	%±
1850	1,381		—
1860	1,395		1.0%
1870	1,614		15.7%
1880	2,040		26.4%
1890	1,928		−5.5%
1900	2,135		10.7%
1910	2,161		1.2%
1920	2,087		−3.4%
1930	1,929		−7.6%
1940	2,213		14.7%
1950	2,530		14.3%
1960	2,517		−0.5%
1970	2,582		2.6%
1980	3,042		17.8%
1990	2,531		−16.8%
2000	3,015		19.1%
2010	2,893		−4.0%
2020	2,961		2.4%
U.S. Decennial Census

=== 2020 census ===
As of the 2020 census, Delphi had a population of 2,961. The median age was 38.7 years. 24.4% of residents were under the age of 18 and 17.2% of residents were 65 years of age or older. For every 100 females there were 93.7 males, and for every 100 females age 18 and over there were 87.5 males age 18 and over.

0.0% of residents lived in urban areas, while 100.0% lived in rural areas.

There were 1,182 households in Delphi, of which 30.9% had children under the age of 18 living in them. Of all households, 40.7% were married-couple households, 19.5% were households with a male householder and no spouse or partner present, and 30.5% were households with a female householder and no spouse or partner present. About 33.0% of all households were made up of individuals and 13.4% had someone living alone who was 65 years of age or older.

There were 1,325 housing units, of which 10.8% were vacant. The homeowner vacancy rate was 2.6% and the rental vacancy rate was 8.6%.

Racial composition as of the 2020 census
Race	Number	Percent
White	2,534	85.6%
Black or African American	69	2.3%
American Indian and Alaska Native	35	1.2%
Asian	13	0.4%
Native Hawaiian and Other Pacific Islander	0	0.0%
Some other race	147	5.0%
Two or more races	163	5.5%
Hispanic or Latino (of any race)	358	12.1%

=== 2010 census ===
At the 2010 census there were 2,893 people, 1,135 households, and 694 families living in the city. The population density was 1,059.7 inhabitants per square mile (409.2/km^{2}). There were 1,270 housing units at an average density of 465.2 per square mile (179.6/km^{2}). The racial makeup of the city was 91.7% White, 0.4% African American, 0.2% Native American, 0.2% Asian, 5.5% from other races, and 1.9% from two or more races. Hispanic or Latino of any race were 11.3%.

Of the 1,135 households 32.8% had children under the age of 18 living with them, 44.1% were married couples living together, 11.2% had a female householder with no husband present, 5.8% had a male householder with no wife present, and 38.9% were non-families. 33.1% of households were one person and 16.2% were one person aged 65 or older. The average household size was 2.46 and the average family size was 3.12.

The median age was 37.5 years. 25.9% of residents were under the age of 18; 8.5% were between the ages of 18 and 24; 25.5% were from 25 to 44; 22.3% were from 45 to 64; and 18% were 65 or older. The gender makeup of the city was 47.9% male and 52.1% female.

=== 2000 census ===
At the 2000 census there were 3,015 people, 1,161 households, and 748 families living in the city. The population density was 1,179.3 inhabitants per square mile (455.3/km^{2}). There were 1,241 housing units at an average density of 485.4 per square mile (187.4/km^{2}). The racial makeup of the city was 92.57% White, 0.13% African American, 0.20% Native American, 0.27% Asian, 5.87% from other races, and 0.96% from two or more races. Hispanic or Latino of any race were 12.17%.

Of the 1,161 households 31.1% had children under the age of 18 living with them, 52.0% were married couples living together, 7.6% had a female householder with no husband present, and 35.5% were non-families. 31.3% of households were one person and 17.1% were one person aged 65 or older. The average household size was 2.50 and the average family size was 3.13.

The age distribution was 25.9% under the age of 18, 8.2% from 18 to 24, 29.6% from 25 to 44, 18.9% from 45 to 64, and 17.4% 65 or older. The median age was 35 years. For every 100 females, there were 96.7 males. For every 100 females age 18 and over, there were 90.9 males.

The median household income was $34,388 and the median family income was $45,878. Males had a median income of $31,360 versus $18,575 for females. The per capita income for the city was $16,703. About 7.4% of families and 13.4% of the population were below the poverty line, including 21.9% of those under age 18 and 6.0% of those age 65 or over.

== Education ==
The Delphi Community School Corporation operates public schools, including Delphi Community High School.

The city has a free lending library, the Delphi Public Library.

== Notable people ==
- William "Dick the Bruiser" Afflis, professional wrestler and football player
- Moses E. Clapp, U.S. senator from Minnesota
- William V. Lucas, U.S. representative from South Dakota
- Doxie Moore, professional basketball coach
- John Gould Moyer, 31st governor of American Samoa
- Bob Olinger, last victim of Billy The Kid
- Walter B. Rogers, musician and bandleader
- Robert H. Shaffer, pioneer in the field of college student personnel and student affairs
- Betty Wason, author/broadcast journalist
- Gregory Wasson, president and CEO of Walgreens
- Clarence Whistler, professional wrestler

== Gallery ==
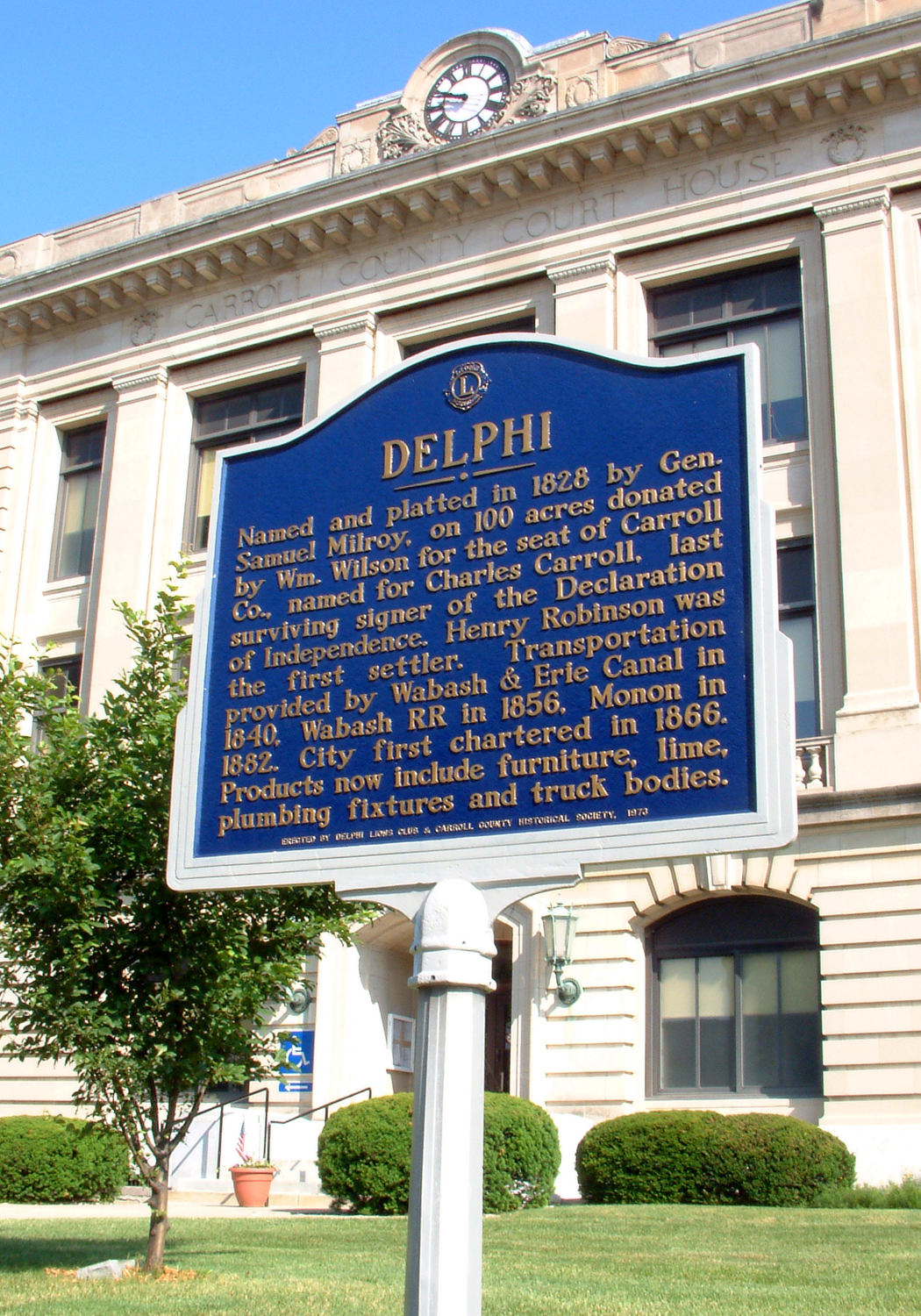
Historical marker at the county courthouse

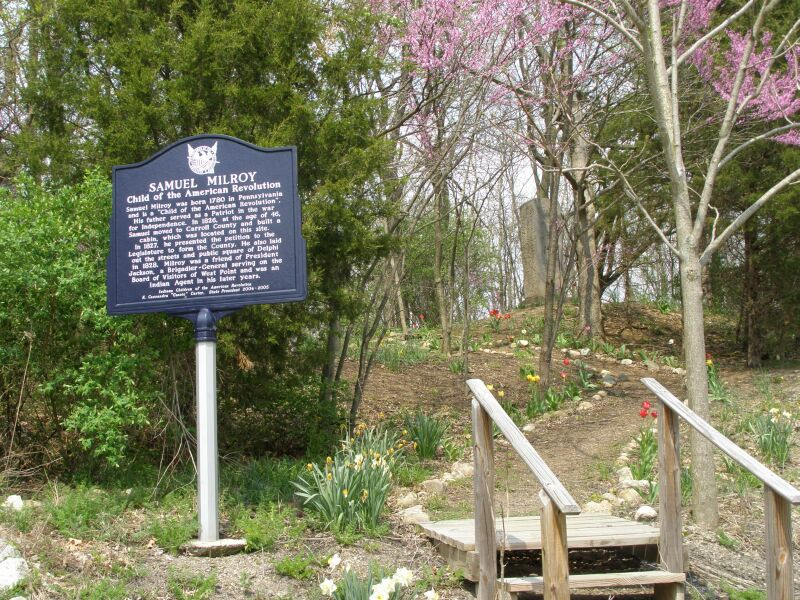
Site of Samuel Milroy's cabin

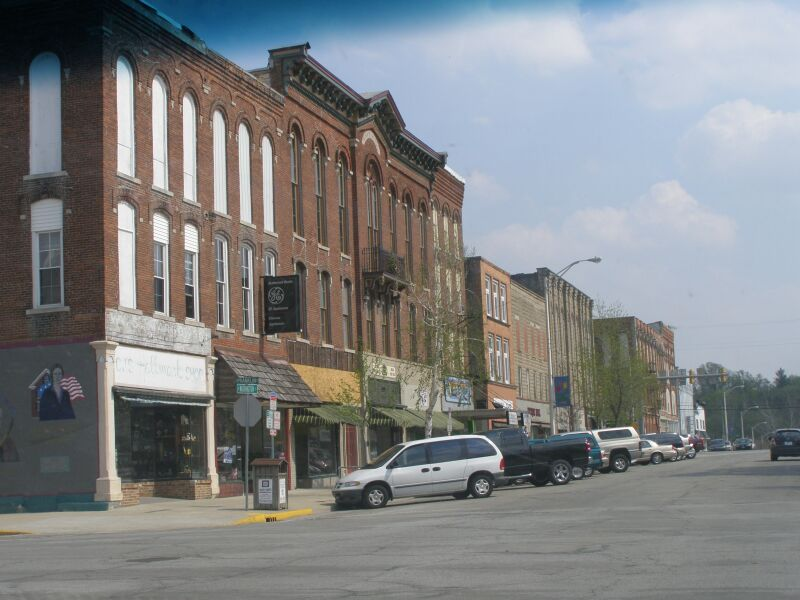
The downtown area near the courthouse

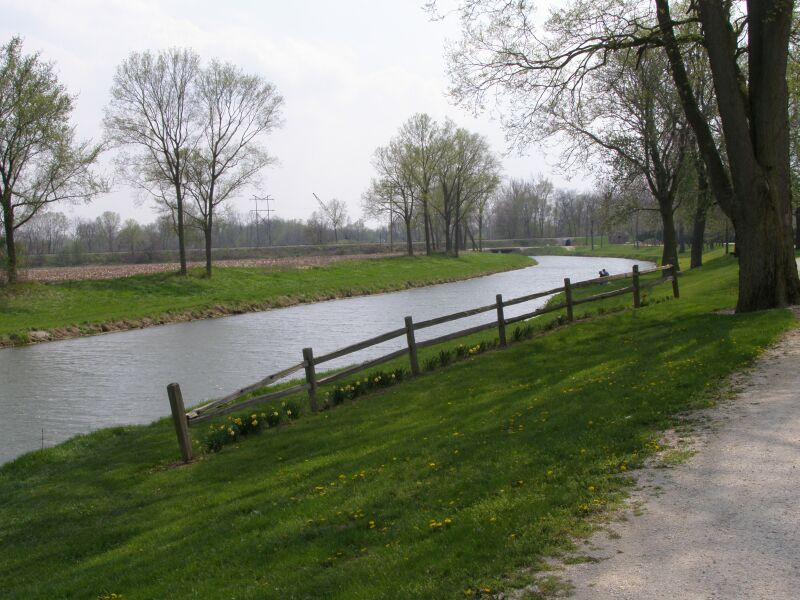
Wabash and Erie Canal (Canal Park)

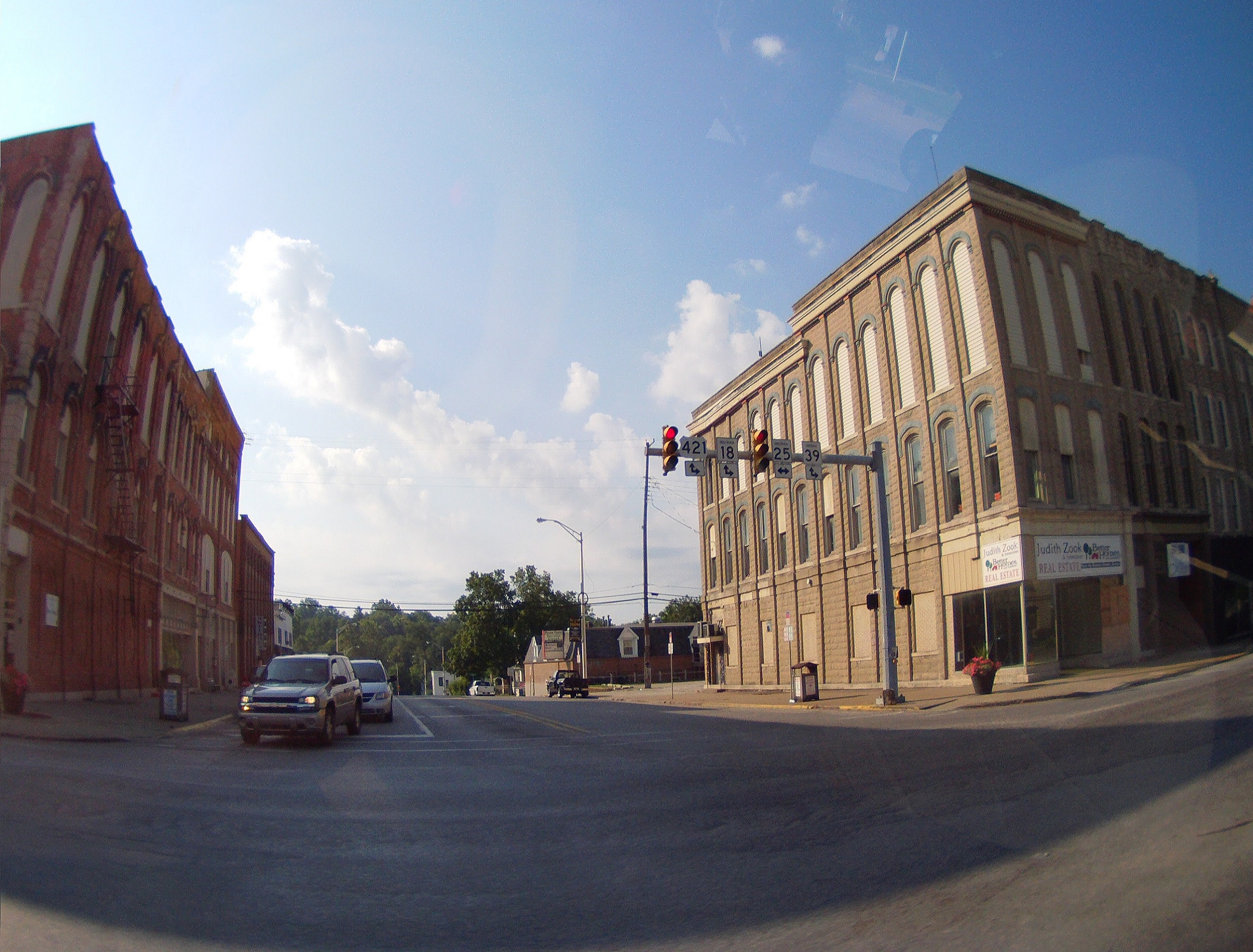
Looking south at Washington and Main

== See also ==
- Soldiers and Sailors Monument in Delphi
- Murphy Memorial Drinking Fountain
- Murders of Abigail Williams and Liberty German, known as the "Delphi murders" (2017)
