= Barnett-Seawright-Wilson House =

Historic house in Indiana, United States

- U.S. National Register of Historic Places
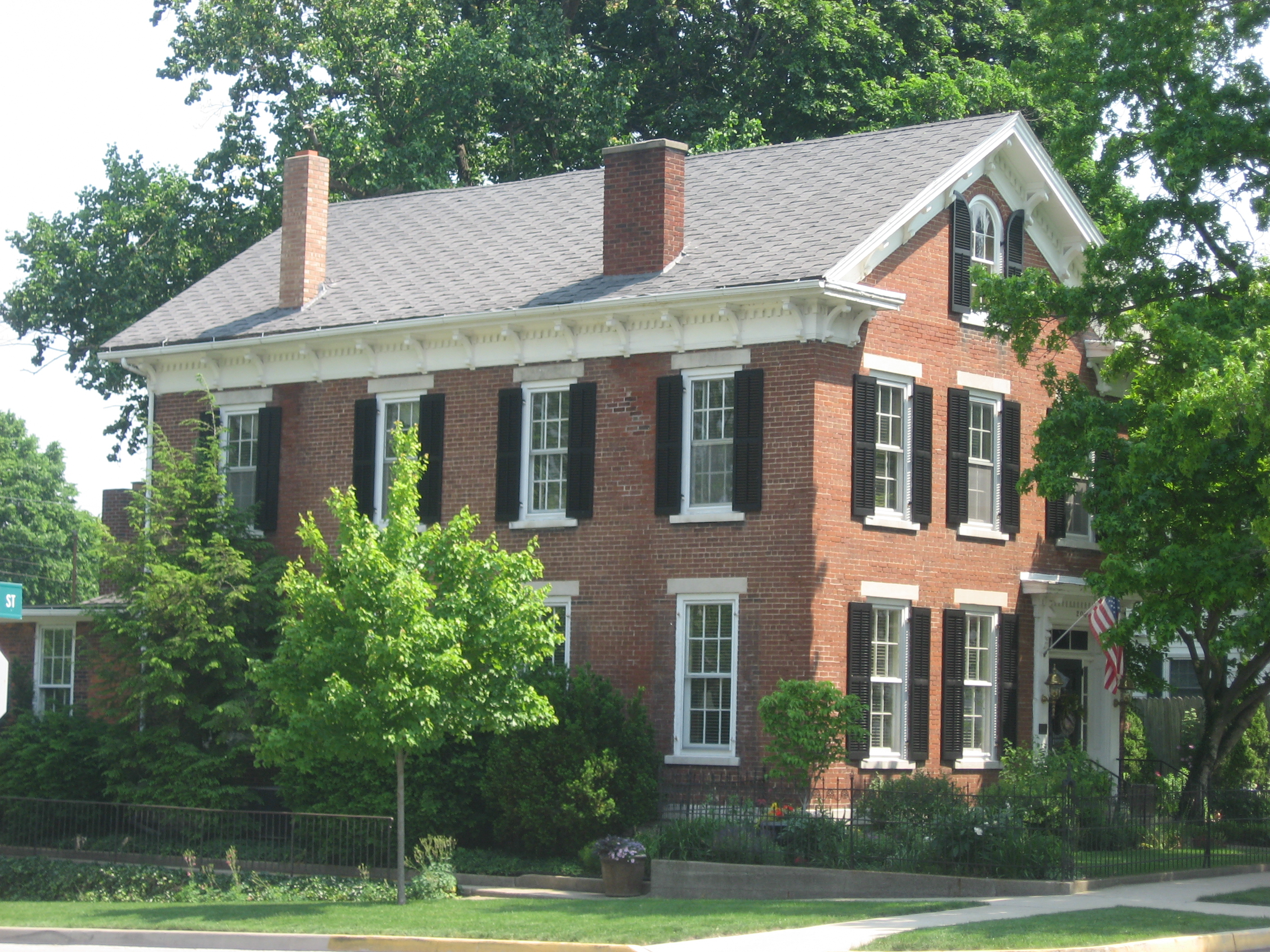
- Barnett-Seawright-Wilson House, June 2011

- Location within Carroll County, Indiana Location within Indiana Location within the United States
- Location: 203 E. Monroe St., Delphi, Indiana
- Coordinates: 40°35′18″N 86°40′25″W
- Area: less than one acre
- Built: 1857
- Built by: Barnett, William
- Architectural style: Greek Revival, Italianate
- NRHP reference No.: 80000054
- Added to NRHP: September 17, 1980

Barnett-Seawright-Wilson House, also known as the Fowler House, is a historic home located at Delphi, Indiana. It was built in 1857, and is a 2 1/2-story, transitional Greek Revival / Italianate style red brick dwelling. It has a limestone block foundation, gable roof, and measures 26 feet wide and 48 feet deep.

It was listed on the National Register of Historic Places in 1980.
