= Delphi City Hall =

- U.S. National Register of Historic Places
- U.S. Historic district – Contributing property
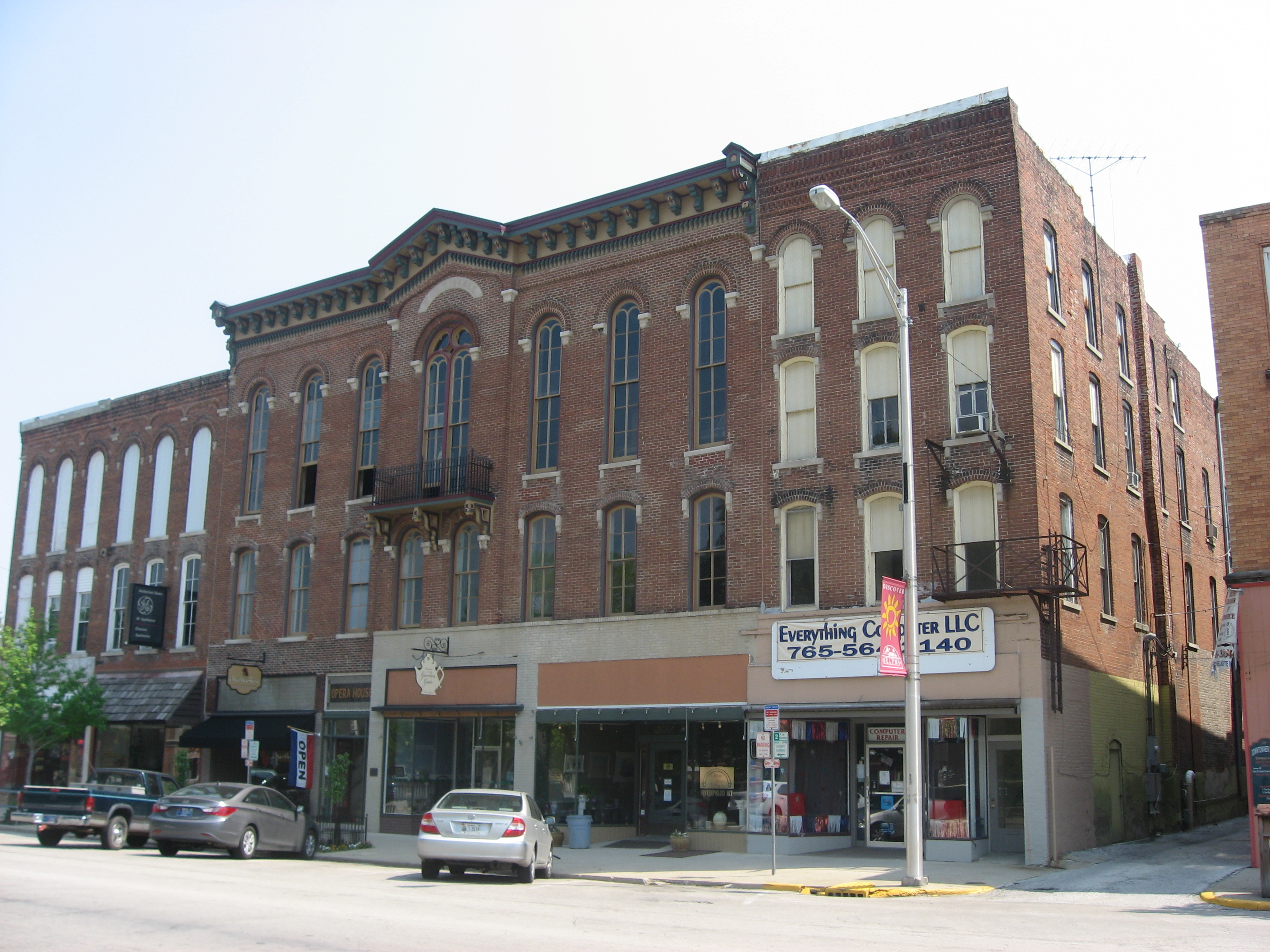

- Location within Carroll County, Indiana Location within Indiana Location within the United States
- Location: 105-109 Washington St., Delphi, Indiana
- Coordinates: 40°35′12″N 86°40′26″W
- Area: less than one acre
- Built: 1865, 1881
- Architectural style: Italianate
- NRHP reference No.: 98001525
- Added to NRHP: December 17, 1998

Delphi City Hall, also known as the Assian-Ruffing Building and Old City Hall-Opera House, is a historic city hall located at 105-109 Washington Street in Delphi, Indiana. It was built in 1865, and is a three-story, Italianate style red brick building. The third floor was remodeled for use as an opera house in 1881. The building was damaged by a fire in December 1914 and the third floor has remained vacant since.

It was listed on the National Register of Historic Places in 1998. It is located in the Delphi Courthouse Square Historic District.
