= Delphi Methodist Episcopal Church =

Historic church in Indiana, United States

- U.S. National Register of Historic Places
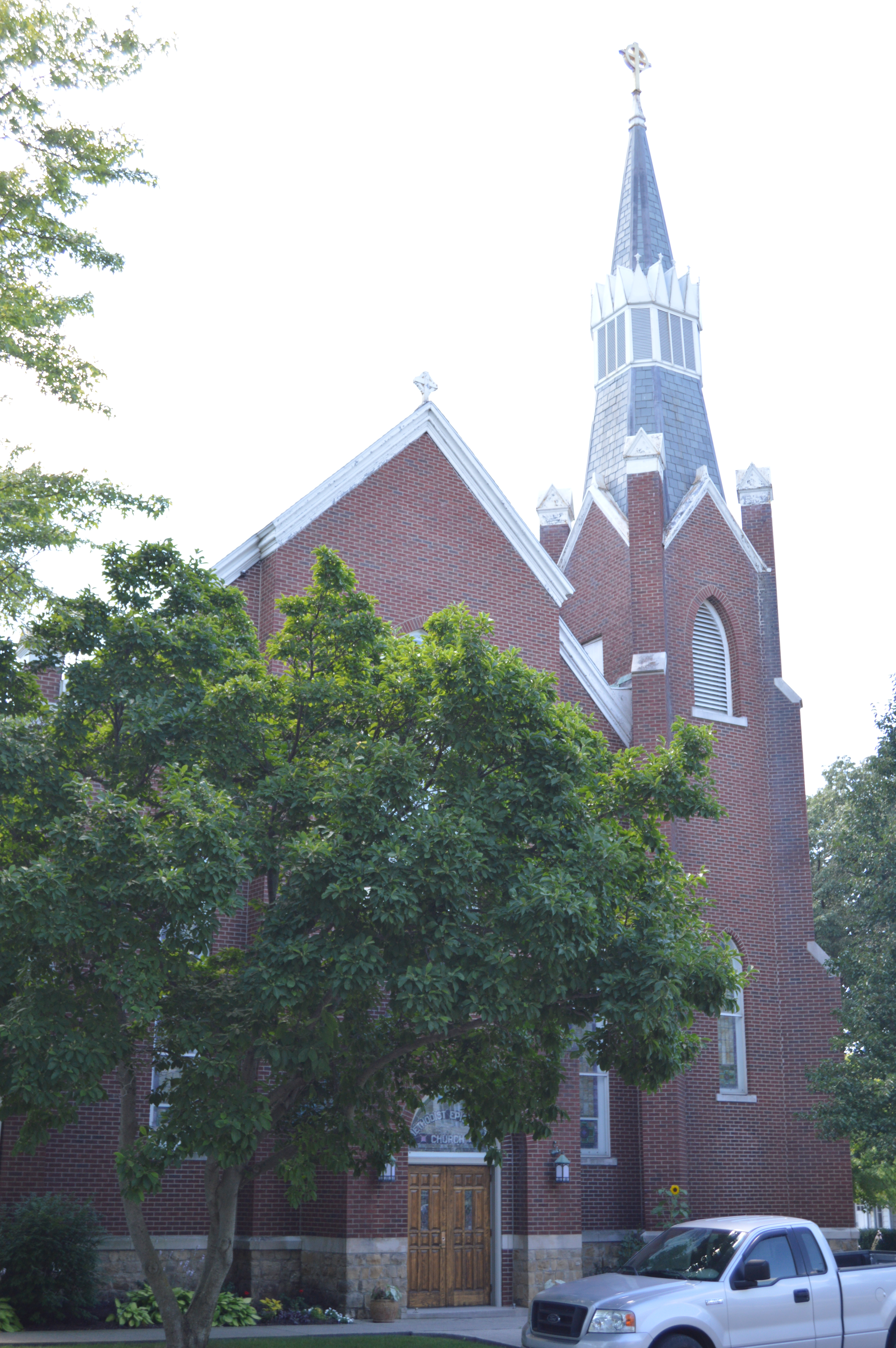
- Delphi Methodist Episcopal Church, July 2015

- Location within Carroll County, Indiana Location within Indiana Location within the United States
- Location: 118 N. Union St., Delphi, Indiana
- Coordinates: 40°35′17″N 86°40′26″W
- Area: Less than 1 acre (0.40 ha)
- Built: 1869, 1884, 1897, 1926
- Built by: W. R. Dunkin and Sons
- Architect: Wolever, Frank
- Architectural style: Late Gothic Revival/Collegiate Gothic; Second Empire
- NRHP reference No.: 15000592
- Added to NRHP: September 14, 2015

Delphi Methodist Episcopal Church is a historic Methodist Episcopal church complex located at Delphi, Indiana. The brick and limestone trimmed Gothic Revival style church sanctuary/auditorium was constructed in 1869 with alterations in 1884, 1897, and 1926. It features a massive three-story bell tower on its northeast corner. The education wing was constructed in 1926 in the Collegiate Gothic style. Also on the property is the two-story, Second Empire style brick parsonage constructed in 1897.

It was listed on the National Register of Historic Places in 2015.
