= Niewerth Building =

- U.S. National Register of Historic Places
- U.S. Historic district – Contributing property
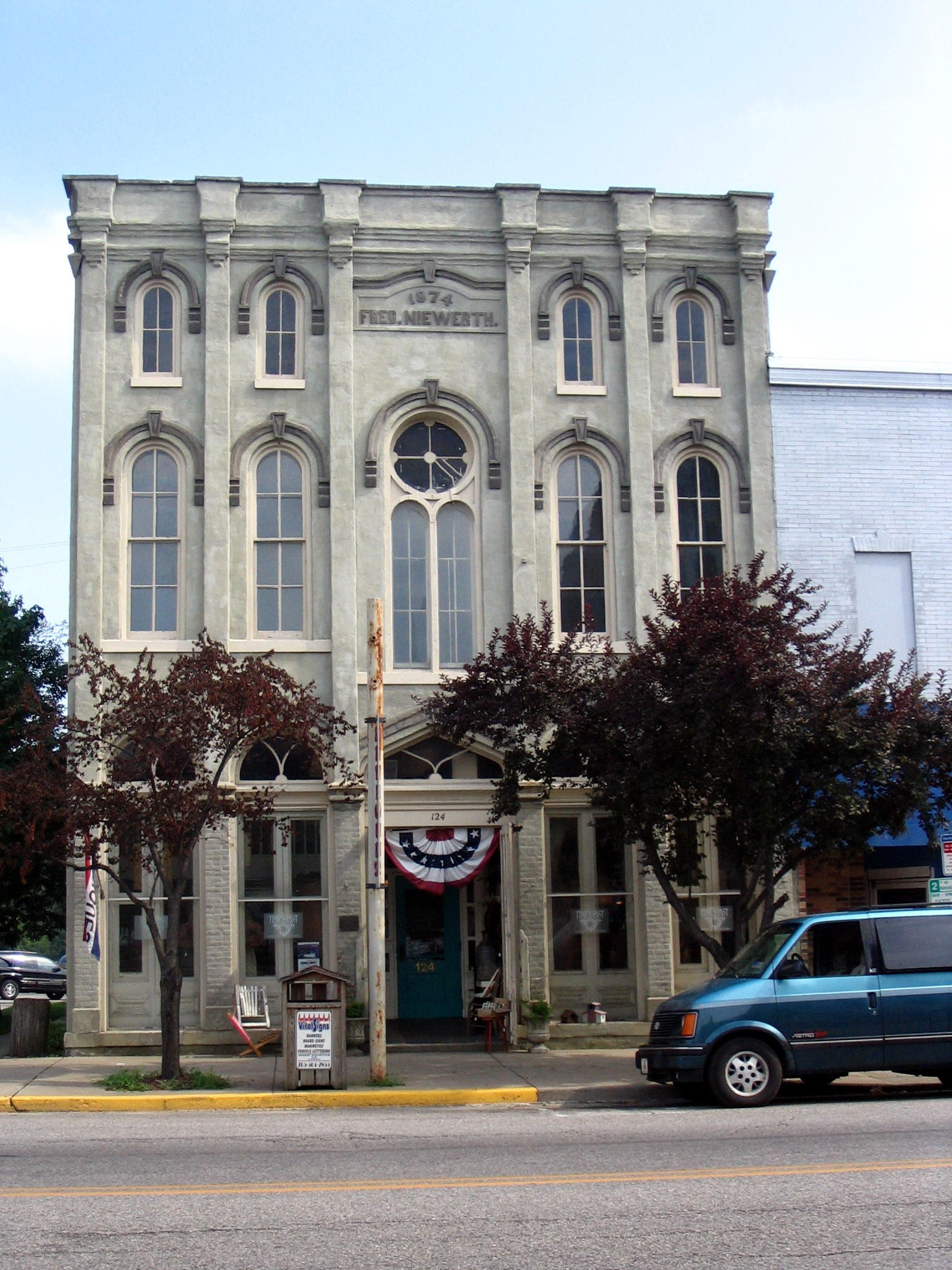
- Niewerth Building, July 2005

- Location within Carroll County, Indiana Location within Indiana Location within the United States
- Location: 124 E. Main St., Delphi, Indiana
- Coordinates: 40°35′10″N 86°40′22″W
- Area: less than one acre
- Built: 1874
- Architect: Freshour, Samuel; Shockley, J. R.
- Architectural style: Italianate
- NRHP reference No.: 84001001
- Added to NRHP: May 24, 1984

The Niewerth Building (also known as Hamling's Tavern) is a historic commercial building located at 124 East Main Street, Delphi, Indiana.

== Description and history ==
It was built in 1874, and is a two-story, five-bay, Italianate style brick building. It measures 30 feet wide and 74 feet deep. The exterior was coated with stucco in the 1930s. The front facade features a limestone nameplate labeled "1874 F. Niewerth", a triangular arched entry, and cameo window.

It was listed on the National Register of Historic Places on May 24, 1984. It is located in the Delphi Courthouse Square Historic District.
