= List of pharmacists =

This is a list of notable pharmacists, sorted by particular fields in which they distinguished themselves:

== Pharmacy practice ==
- Dora Akunyili (1954-2010), Director General of National Agency for Food and Drug Administration and Control of Nigeria
- George F. Archambault (1910–2001), considered to be the "father" of consultant pharmacy
- Sabina Baldoncelli (b. 1781), one of the first Italian female pharmacists with a university degree but was allowed to work only in an orphanage
- Philo Carpenter (1805–1886), first pharmacist in Chicago, Illinois
- Maria Dauerer (1624–1688), first Swedish female apothecary
- Donald E. Francke (1910–1978), founder of Annals of Pharmacotherapy, editor of American Journal of Hospital Pharmacy, co-author of Mirror to Hospital Pharmacy
- Gloria Niemeyer Francke (1922–2008), first executive secretary of the American Society of Health-System Pharmacists and Associate Editor of the American Journal of Hospital Pharmacy
- Edna Gleason, American pharmacist and "mother of fair-trade"
- Elizabeth Gooking Greenleaf (1681–1762), first American female apothecary
- Elsie Higgon (1879–1969), English pharmacist and president of the National Association of Women Pharmacists
- Isa Marte Hussaini (born 1956), Nigerian pharmacist and fellow of the Nigerian Academy of Science
- Aziza Ouahchi (1933 – 1993) was a leading Tunisian pharmacist,
- Tadeusz Pankiewicz (1908–1993), Polish pharmacist in the Kraków Ghetto
- William Procter, Jr. (1817–1872), regarded as the "father of American pharmacy", was instrumental in the founding of the American Pharmaceutical Association in 1852
- Joseph P. Remington, namesake of the Remington Medal
- Zoe Rosinach Pedrol (1894–1973), Catalan pharmacist and the first Spanish woman to earn a doctorate in Pharmacy
- R. Tim Webster (1946–2003), founder and long-time executive director of the American Society of Consultant Pharmacists
- Harvey A. K. Whitney (1894–1957), founder and first president of the American Society of Health-System Pharmacists in 1942
- J. Richard Wuest (1937-2026), creator of colored auxiliary labels. Professor and academic at the University of Cincinnati.

== Pharmacy business ==
- George H. Bartell, Sr. (1868–1956), American founder of Bartell Drugs, the oldest family–owned drug store chain in the United States
- David Bernauer, American, former CEO of Walgreens drug store chain
- Jesse Boot (1850–1931), British businessman and transformer of the Boots Pharmacy/Drug Company into a national retailer
- John Boot (1815–1860), British founder of Boots the Chemists
- Ornella Barra, Italian, Chief Executive, Pharmaceutical Wholesale Division Alliance Boots
- Jean Coutu (born 1927), French Canadian founder of the Jean Coutu Group
- Jack Eckerd (1913–2004), owner/founder of Eckerd Drugs
- David Jack (1924–2011), leader of research that developed major asthma drugs
- Murray Koffler (1924–2017), founder of Canadian drug store chain Shoppers Drug Mart
- Ernest Mario, American pharmaceutical industry executive
- Jeff Rein (born 1953), former CEO of Walgreens drug store chain
- Thomas Ryan, American, former CEO of CVS Caremark drug store chain
- Charles Rudolph Walgreen (1873–1939), founder of Walgreens Drugstore

== Botany and chemistry ==
- Jean Baptiste Christophore Fusée Aublet (1720–1778), French botanist and explorer
- Ibn al-Baitar (1197–1248), Islamic physician, pharmacist, botanist, and scientist from the Middle Ages
- Bill Charman, Australian pharmaceutical scientist
- Stanley Stewart Davis (born 1942), winner of Eurand Award for Outstanding Research in Oral Drug Delivery
- Georg Joseph Kamel (1661–1706), Czech Jesuit missionary and botanist
- John Uri Lloyd (1849–1936), influential American pharmacist
- Charles Mohr (1824–1901), German botanist
- James Parkinson, English apothecary and namesake of the disease Parkinson's
- Ruiz y Pavón (1850–1931), Ruiz and Pavón, Spanish famous pharmacists
- Pierre Joseph Pelletier (1788–1842), co-discoverer of quinine, caffeine, and strychnine
- James Petiver (ca. 1664–1718), botanist and entomologist, considered the "father of British butterflies"
- Sara Borrell Ruiz (1917–1999), Spanish steroid hormone researcher
- Carl Wilhelm Scheele (1742–1786), German-Swedish chemist, discoverer of oxygen
- Wilbur Scoville (1865–1942), American developer of the Scoville Organoleptic Test
- Friedrich Sertürner (1783–1841), German chemist and discover of morphine
- Eugène Soubeiran (1797–1859), French discover of chloroform
- Elizabeth Williamson (fl. 1978), Professor of pharmacy and researcher in herbal medicines

== Industry ==
- Paul Carl Beiersdorf (1836–1896), German founder of Beiersdorf AG
- Herbert Haft (1920–2004), American corporate raider
- Oscar Troplowitz (1863–1918), German entrepreneur and owner of Beiersdorf AG
- Ignacy Łukasiewicz (1822–1882), Polish pharmacist, inventor of kerosene lamp, pioneer of oil industry in Europe
- Paul Jean Rigollot (1810-1873), French pharmacist, inventor and chocolatier

== Soft drinks ==
- Charles Alderton (1857–1941), American inventor of the soft drink Dr Pepper
- Caleb Bradham (1867–1934), American inventor of the soft drink Pepsi
- Charles Elmer Hires (1851–1937), American inventor of the soft drink Hires Root Beer
- John Pemberton (1831–1888), American inventor of the soft drink Coca-Cola
- James Vernor (1843–1927), American inventor of Vernor's ginger ale

== Politics ==
- Lawrence Brock (1906–1968), Nebraskan politician
- Buddy Carter (born 1957), politician from Georgia USA
- Ikililou Dhoinine (born 1962), Comorian politician
- Misako Enoki (born 1945), Japanese feminist, pharmacist, and politician
- Pravin Gordhan (born 1949), minister in South African government
- John Hodges (1937–2024), Australian politician
- Chuck Hopson (born 1941), Texas politician
- Hubert Humphrey (1911–1978), pharmacist and 38th Vice President of the United States
- Altaf Hussain (born 1961), Pakistani politician; founder of APMSO and of MQM, the third largest political party of Pakistan
- Cornelius Comegys Jadwin (1835–1913), Republican member of the U.S. House of Representatives from Pennsylvania
- Ronnie Johns (born 1949), Louisiana state legislator
- Tony Lamb (born 1939), Australian politician
- Bernard LeBas (born 1943), Louisiana state legislator
- Antonio Luna (1866–1899), Philippine General
- Nancy McFarlane (born 1956), mayor of Raleigh, North Carolina
- Randy McNally (born 1944), Tennessee politician
- Fred Mills (born 1955), member of the Louisiana State Senate
- Robert Nutting (born 1947), member of the Maine House of Representatives
- Dave O'Neal (1937–2021), Lieutenant Governor of Illinois
- Oscar Rennebohm (1889–1968), 32nd Governor of Wisconsin (1947–1951)
- George H. Ryan (born 1934), Illinois Governor
- Charlie Smithgall (born 1945), Mayor of Lancaster, Pennsylvania
- Ron Stephens (born 1954), member of Georgia House of Representatives
- Harve Tibbott (1885–1969), Republican politician and U.S. House of Representatives from Pennsylvania
- Edwin Tsitsi (1925–1997), Nauruan MP
- Evan Vickers (born 1954), Utah politician
- Gerry Weiner (born 1933), Canadian politician; former Progressive Conservative Party of Canada MP and cabinet minister, president of the Equality Party and mayor of Dollard-des-Ormeaux, Quebec
- Terry White (born 1936), Australian businessman and politician
- Jim Wilson (1872–1956), pioneering banker and Los Angeles City Council member

== Other ==
- Adaeze Atuegwu (born 1977), Nigerian-American author, pharmacist, and disability inclusion advocate
- Michel Casseux (1794–1869), French developer of Savate
- Étienne J. Caire (1868–1955), Louisiana merchant
- Theodor Fontane (1819–1898), German novelist and poet
- Thorrun Govind, British pharmacist and solicitor
- O. Henry (1862–1910), American writer, real name William Sidney Porter
- Colin Murdoch (1929–2008), New Zealand inventor (tranquilizer gun, disposable hypodermic syringe, child–proof medicine container)
- Edna O'Brien (born 1930), Irish author and playwright
- John O'Grady, Australian writer They're a Weird Mob)
- Pat Ogrin (born 1958), American football player
- Alberto de Oliveira (1855–1937), Brazilian poet, pharmacist and professor
- Hans Christian Ørsted (1777–1851), Danish physicist who discovered electromagnetism
- György Pásztor, International Ice Hockey Federation doping in sport committee chairman
- Jean-Claude Pressac (1944–2003), French chemist and authority on the Holocaust of World War II
- Nina Radojičić (born 1968), Serbian pharmacist and singer, represented Serbia in the Eurovision Song Contest 2011
- Daniel B Smith (1792–1883), American educator
- Joseph Swan (1828–1914), inventor of the incandescent light bulb
- Naoko Takeuchi (born 1957), Japanese pharmacist, manga artist best known for work on Sailor Moon
- John Worsfold (born 1968), Australian football player

== Fictional pharmacists ==
- Douglas "Doug" Varney (Sam Rockwell) in Better Living Through Chemistry
- Eddie Walzer (Paul Schulze) in Nurse Jackie
- Percival Almanac (Barry Otto) in The Dressmaker
- Yusuf (Dileep Rao) in Inception
- Ned Flanders (Harry Shearer) in the early seasons of The Simpsons
