= R. Tim Webster =

R. Tim Webster

R. Tim Webster, SCD (October 9, 1946 – July 6, 2003) was a founder and long-time executive director of the American Society of Consultant Pharmacists (ASCP). He was born October 9, 1946, in Martins Ferry, Ohio and lived in St. Clairsville, Ohio until he graduated from high school. He received his degree in pharmacy from Ohio State University (OSU) in 1969 and then dedicated his entire career to promoting quality pharmaceutical care to the elderly. Prior to his 27-year tenure as executive director of the ASCP, he was involved in regulatory affairs relating to long-term care in both the public and private sector. He died of cancer on July 6, 2003.

Under Webster's leadership, ASCP produced scores of reference materials, policies, award-winning publications, educational programs, internet resources, and other products and services that allow ASCP members to provide the highest levels of professional pharmacy services to seniors living in a wide variety of settings. He championed the cause of taking the expertise ASCP members honed in more than thirty years of experience in nursing facilities to the larger senior population. He was also the founder of ASCP's monthly peer-reviewed journal, The Consultant Pharmacist, which continues to add to the immense body of knowledge used by consultant pharmacists to provide pharmaceutical care to seniors.

Recognition for his contributions to the advancement of the pharmacy profession include the American Pharmaceutical Association’s Hugo Schaefer Award in 2003, an honorary Doctor of Science degree from the Philadelphia College of Pharmacy in 1998, the ASCP George F. Archambault Award for specialty practice in consultant pharmacy in 1990, Ohio State University (OSU) College of Pharmacy's 1991 Distinguished Alumni Award and 1996 Vision Award and the R. Timothy Webster Scholarship in Long Term Care Pharmacy at OSU.

Webster had been secretary of the American Society of Consultant Pharmacists Foundation and trustee of the Geriatric Drug Therapy Research Institute and Neimerow Institute. He was a member of the American Pharmaceutical Association, the American Society of Health-System Pharmacists, the American Society for Pharmacy and Law, the National Council for Patient Information, the Joint Commission of Pharmacy Practitioners, the American Society of Association Executives, the Alexandria chamber of commerce, and the Dean's Council of the OSU College of Pharmacy.

Webster was the author of scores of articles and a frequent speaker in the United States and abroad on a variety health-care topics, including the cost and quality impact of optimizing drug therapy for the elderly. He was publisher of The Consultant Pharmacist, and numerous reference manuals and textbooks for pharmacists, nurses, and other professionals in long-term care. He led development of the Commission for Certification in Geriatric Pharmacy, a professional program for board certification of geriatric pharmacy practice, designed to ensure and enhance the quality of pharmacy and pharmaceutical care services for the elderly.
