= Purdue University College of Pharmacy =

Pharmacy school in Indiana, US

- Logo is a stylized mortar and pestle.
- Established: 1884
- Affiliations: Purdue University System
- Dean: Eric L. Barker, Ph.D.
- Faculty: 108
- Students: 1200
- Undergraduates: 1070
- Postgraduates: 130
- Location: West Lafayette, IN, USA; 40.4299°N 86.9160°W
- Website: pharmacy.purdue.edu

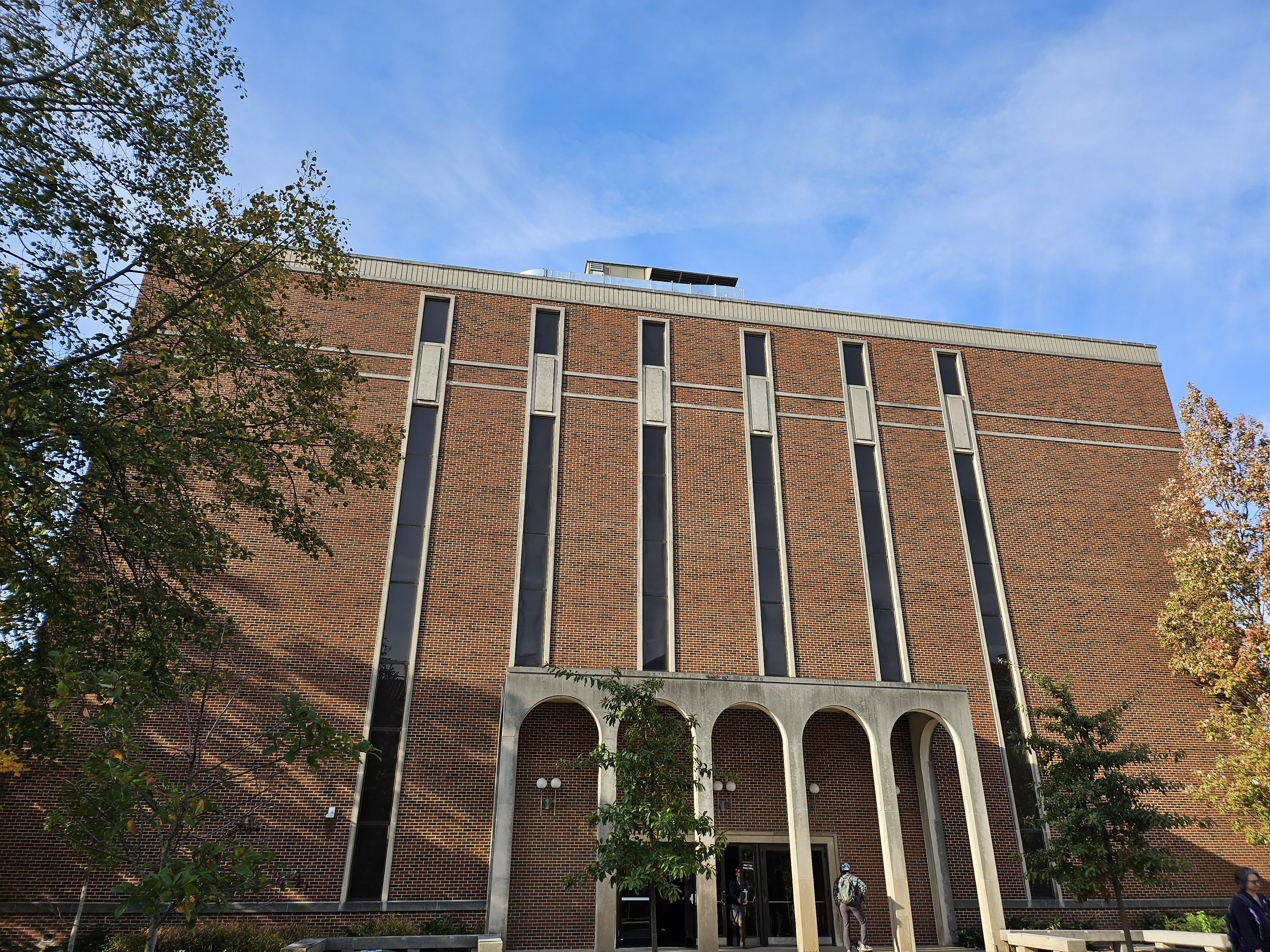
Robert E. Heine Pharmacy Building

The Purdue University College of Pharmacy is the pharmacy school of Purdue University, a public university in West Lafayette, Indiana. It was established in 1884, and is the third oldest state-funded school of pharmacy in the United States. The school has consistently ranked highly among its peer institutions.

The school offers two undergraduate programs leading to the B.S. in Pharmaceutical Sciences (BSPS) and the Doctor of Pharmacy (Pharm.D.) professional degree. Graduate programs leading to M.S. and Ph.D. degrees are offered in three departments (Industrial and Physical Pharmacy, Medicinal Chemistry and Molecular Pharmacology, and Pharmacy Practice). Additionally, the school offers several non-degree certificate programs and post-graduate continuing education activities.

The majority of professional degree classes are conducted in the Robert E. Heine Pharmacy Building, which opened in 1970. The building is home to research laboratories, the Pharmacy, Nursing, and Health Sciences Library and the Purdue Pharmacy.

== Departments ==
The College of Pharmacy consists of three Departments:

- Industrial and Molecular Pharmaceutics
- Medicinal Chemistry and Molecular Pharmacology
- Pharmacy Practice

== History ==
In the summer of 1883, Purdue's fourth president James H. Smart was conversing with his friend, John N. Hurty, in Hurty's Indianapolis drugstore. Hurty brought up the idea that it would be a good idea for Purdue University (founded 14 years earlier) to offer courses to train students as pharmacists. It is said that Smart agreed, and would fight for the establishment of a pharmacy school at Purdue as long as Hurty served as professor for at least two years. Hurty accepted, and in September 1884, classes began with seven students. Hurty was well-qualified for the position. Having completed courses at the Philadelphia College of Pharmacy, Indianapolis College of Pharmacy (acquired by Butler University in 1904), attended lectures at Jefferson Medical College in 1872, and graduated from the Medical College of Indiana (acquired by Indiana University in 1908) in 1881, his background was likely influential in establishing the scientific rigor that characterized the new curriculum (at the time, a unique quality in pharmacy education).

In 1884 a two-year School of Pharmacy was founded. The School of Nursing began as a program in 1963 and was incorporated as a department into the Purdue University College of Technology in 1964. In 1979 the School of Health Sciences was formed under the newly organized Schools of Pharmacy, Nursing, and Health Sciences. In 2005 this group was renamed the College of Pharmacy, Nursing, and Health Sciences. Five years later, the Schools of Nursing and Health Sciences became part of the new College of Health and Human Sciences, leaving the College of Pharmacy with its current name.

The College of Pharmacy has never had an association with Purdue Pharma, a clarification the university has made clear in order to avoid association.

== Notable alumni ==
- Allen Chao
- Donald E. Francke (honorary DSc)
- Gloria Niemeyer Francke
- Kallam Satish Reddy
- Dolores Cooper Shockley

== Notable faculty ==
- Mark Cushman
- David E. Nichols
- Elizabeth Topp
