= Donald E. Francke =

American pharmacist, author and editor (1910–1978)

Donald Eugene Francke (August 28, 1910 – November 6, 1978) was an American pharmacist, author and editor.

== Early life and education ==
Francke was born and raised in Athens, Pennsylvania. He received his BSc in pharmacy (1936) and MSc in pharmaceutical science (1948) from the University of Michigan. While at the University of Michigan he took a part-time job at the university's medical center where he trained under Harvey A.K. Whitney.

== Career ==
From 1944 to 1963 Francke was director of pharmacy at the medical center of the University of Michigan. Francke had been instrumental in the formation of the American Society of Hospital Pharmacists (which later became the American Society of Health-System Pharmacists) and was president of the society from 1942 to 1946. In 1963 he moved to Washington, DC to take the position of head of scientific services at the society. In 1966 he moved to Cincinnati and led the pharmacy departments at both the University of Cincinnati College of Pharmacy and the Cincinnati General Hospital. In 1971 he became a special assistant to the medical director of the Veterans Administration (VA) in Washington, DC. He left the VA and formed his own publishing company, Drug Intelligence Publications, where he edited and published the journal Drug Intelligence and Clinical Pharmacy (DICP), which eventually became the Annals of Pharmacotherapy. The DICP was one of the first publications to advocate for developing the scientific theory and practice of clinical pharmacy, with the focus on enhancing patient welfare. Through his new journal, Francke also advocated for specialization within the pharmacy profession, and defined the concept of "clinical pharmacist". He remained at Drug Intelligence Publications until his death. From 1944 to 1966, Francke was the editor of The Bulletin of the American Society of Hospital Pharmacists which became the American Journal of Hospital Pharmacy. He was also the founder and editor of the American Hospital Formulary Service and International Pharmaceutical Abstracts.

In 1964, he co-authored the results of a survey of hospital pharmacies, Mirror to Hospital Pharmacy: A Report of the Audit of Pharmaceutical Service in Hospitals. The report became an important reference for hospital pharmacies. In 2013, the American Society of Health-System Pharmacists held a session at their mid-year conference in honor of the 50th anniversary of the publication of report.

== Honors and awards ==
Francke was awarded an honorary DSc by Purdue University in 1951 and by his alma mater, University of Michigan, in 1967. He won the American Society of Health-System Pharmacists's (ASHP) Harvey A.K. Whitney Lecture Award in 1953 and the American Pharmacists Association's Remington Honor Medal in 1970. In 1971, he was the first recipient of the ASHP's Donald E. Francke Medal, that honors "significant international contributions [that] advance pharmacy practice."

== Personal life ==
Francke was twice married. He married Maxine Hafey in 1937; they had five children. In 1956, he married Gloria Niemeyer. She was a pharmacist and secretary of the American Association of Hospital Pharmacists. Gloria Niemeyer Francke was the fourth recipient of the Donald E. Franke Medal.

Francke died of a heart attack at his home in Washington, DC. He was 68 years old.

== Selected publications ==
=== Books ===
- Francke, Don Eugene; Latiolais, Clifton; Francke, Gloria N.; Ho, Norman (1964). Mirror to Hospital Pharmacy: A Report of the Audit of Pharmaceutical Service in Hospitals (PDF). Washington, DC: American Society of Hospital Pharmacists.

=== Journal articles and editorials ===
- "Harvey A.K. Whitney Award Lectures: Donald E. Francke". Harvey A.K. Whitney Award Lectures.
