= Purdue University College of Pharmacy, Nursing, and Health Sciences =

Medical college in Indiana

- Active: 1979–2010
- Affiliations: Purdue University
- Dean: Craig K. Svensson
- Faculty: 213
- Undergraduates: 1,893
- Postgraduates: 210
- Location: (United States) West Lafayette, IN, USA
- Website: www.pnhs.purdue.edu

The Purdue University College of Pharmacy, Nursing, and Health Sciences was one of eight major academic divisions, or Colleges, of Purdue University. In 2010, its nursing and health sciences programs became part of the new College of Health and Human Sciences and its pharmacy program became the College of Pharmacy.

== Departments ==
The College of Pharmacy, Nursing, and Health Sciences contained three schools including three minor academic divisions, or Departments and two affiliates.

=== Schools ===
- School of Pharmacy and Pharmaceutical Sciences
  - Department of Industrial and Physical Pharmacy
  - Department of Medicinal Chemistry and Molecular Pharmacology
  - Department of Pharmacy Practice
- School of Nursing
- School of Health Sciences

=== Affiliates ===
- Purdue Cancer Center
- Purdue Interdepartmental NMR Facility

== History ==
In 1884 a two-year School of Pharmacy was founded. The School of Nursing began as a program in 1963 and was incorporated as a department into the Purdue University College of Technology in 1964. In 1979 the School of Health Sciences was formed under the newly organized Schools of Pharmacy, Nursing, and Health Sciences. In 2005 this group was renamed the College of Pharmacy, Nursing, and Health Sciences. Five years later, the Schools of Nursing and Health Sciences became part of the new College of Health and Human Sciences, and the School of Pharmacy and Pharmaceutical Sciences became the College of Pharmacy.
