= William Procter Jr. =

American Pharmacist (1817 – 1874)

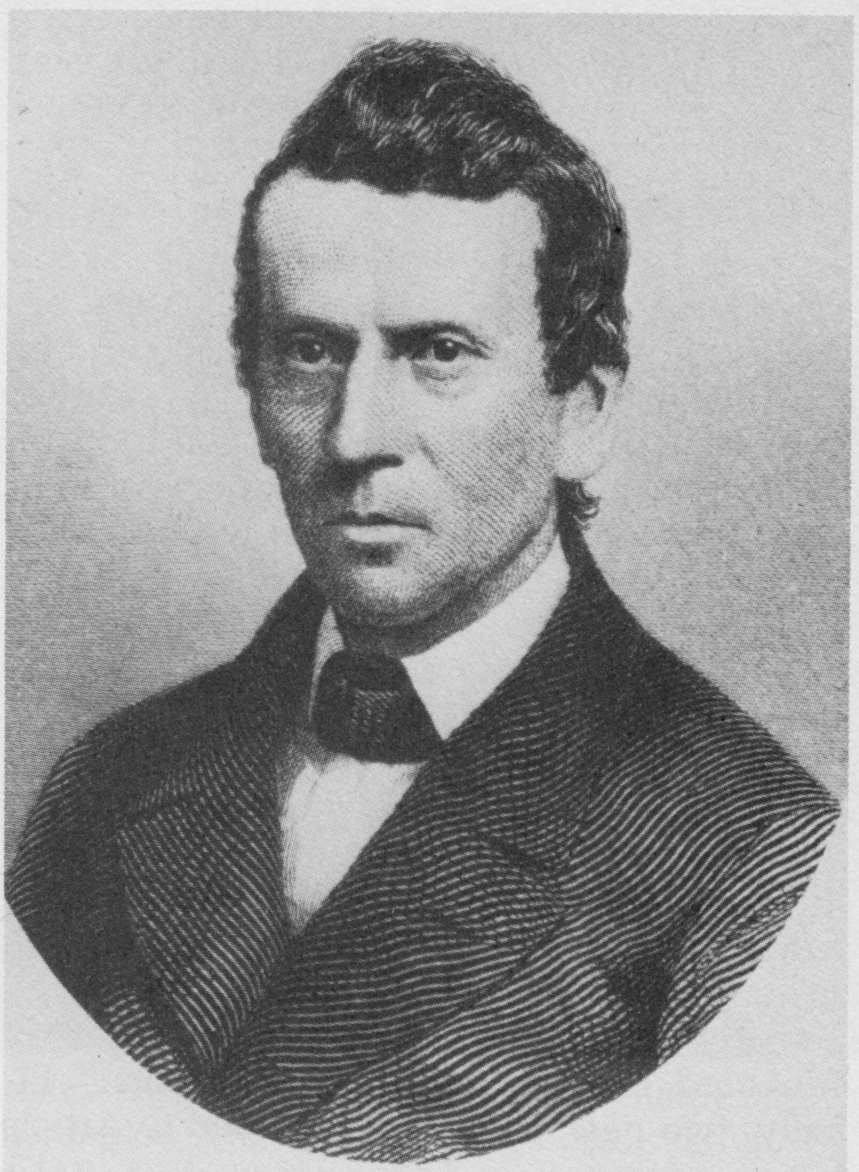
- Born: May 3, 1817; Baltimore, Maryland
- Died: February 10, 1874 (aged 56); Philadelphia, Pennsylvania
- Occupation: Pharmacist
- Known for: Contribution in American Pharmacy
- Notable work: Practical Pharmacy
- Title: Father of American Pharmacy

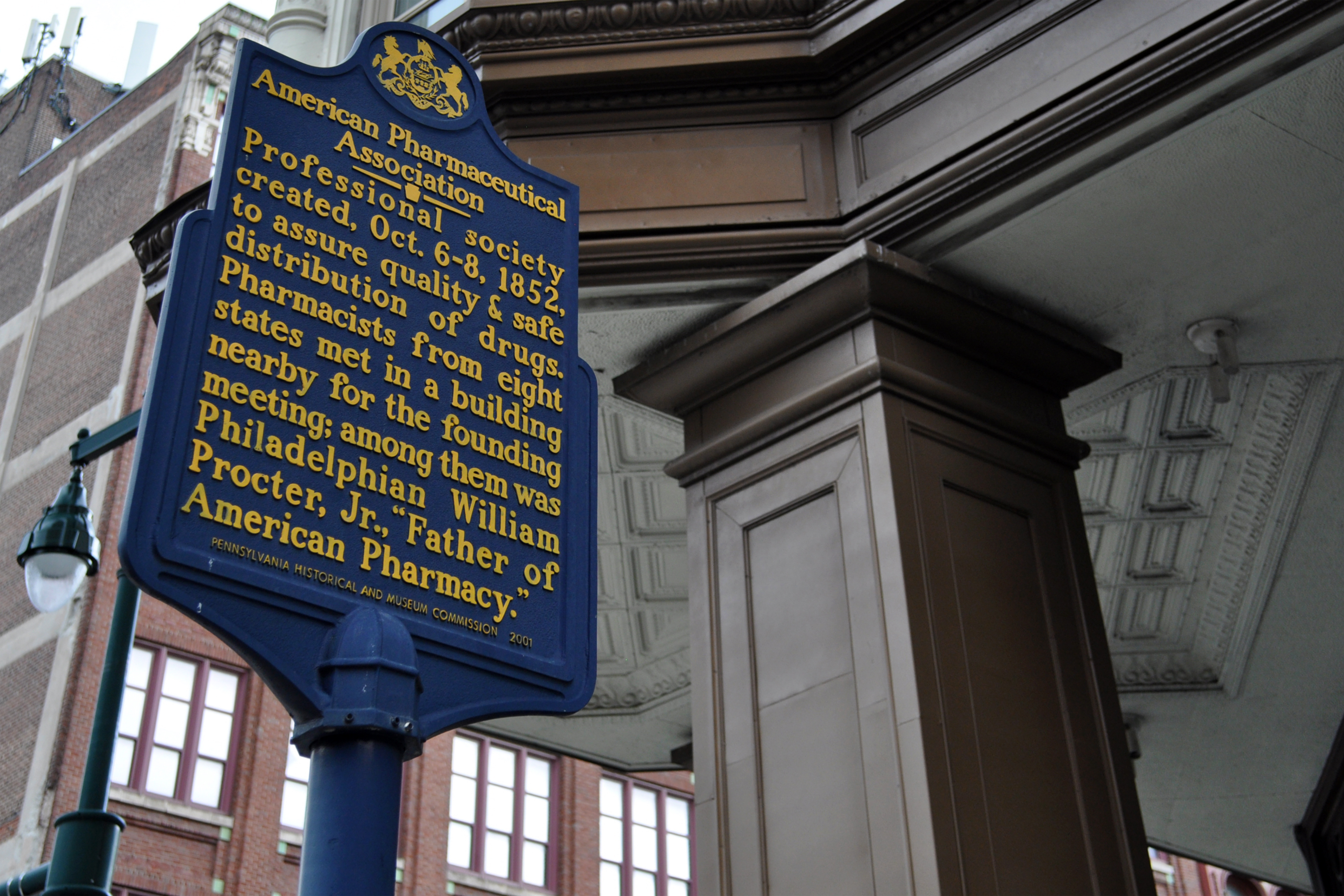
American Pharmaceutical Association Historical Marker at N. 7th and Market Sts. Philadelphia, PA.

William Procter Jr. (May 3, 1817 – February 10, 1874) was an American pharmacist. He is known for his role in establishing the American Pharmacists Association and his work on the United States Pharmacopeia (USP). He was the author/editor of the first pharmacy textbook published in America. He has been referred to as the 'Father of American Pharmacy.'

== Early life ==
Procter was born in Baltimore, Maryland, U.S., to Isaac and Rebecca Procter. Isaac died in 1831 and William, at 14 years old, moved to Philadelphia, Pennsylvania, U.S., to start an apprenticeship.

== Career ==
=== Apprenticeship and education ===
Starting from 1831, Procter entered his apprenticeship in the field with Henry M. Zollickoffer in Philadelphia. Elias Durand, a nearby pharmacist trained in France, encouraged Procter to pursue investigations. He attended the Philadelphia College of Pharmacy, graduating in March 1837.

=== Shop and contributions to journals ===
In 1844, he opened his own shop. Rather than including a soda fountain, his shop featured a laboratory and a writing area where he wrote scientific papers, practical articles, and editorials. He investigated a series of volatile oils, experimenting with new methods and apparatus, and his results were published in the American Journal of Pharmacy.

The assay of drugs became a specialty. Wholesalers paid for analysis before accepting a shipment, and the imported drug materials could vary widely in quality. Drugs rejected in Europe were sometimes shipped to America. Many vendors extended their wares by adding inert materials such as sawdust. In response, the United States Pharmacopeia was created to establish standards for drug quality, the first edition being published in 1820. Procter contributed to the 1840 revision of the work, where the committee later hired him as a consultant. The faculty of the Philadelphia College of Pharmacy assisted. The USP, along with the National Formulary, was adopted as an official standards in the Food and Drug Act of 1906.

In 1848, Procter was named editor of The American Journal of Pharmacy. Similar journals originated in Philadelphia, including the American Journal of Medical Science from 1818 and the Journal of the Franklin Institute from 1824. Procter served as editor until 1870. He added abstracts of articles published in Britain and France. The Civil War stressed the journal's finances as Southerners stopped subscribing. Trimming costs by reducing the number of pages required and financial assistance from the college played a role in maintaining the journal.

=== Founding of the American Pharmaceutical Association ===
Procter played a key role in the founding of the American Pharmaceutical Association in 1851 while he attended the Convention of Pharmaceutics and Druggists in New York. He lobbied for it through editorials in the American Journal of Pharmacy.

=== As a professor ===
Prior to 1847, there were no pharmaceutical textbooks. That changed in 1847 with the textbook from Germany titled Lehrbuch der pharmaceutischen Technik by Karl Friedrich Mohr. In England, Theophilus Redwood translated the book and adapted it to English practice, resulting in Practical Pharmacy, which arrived in the U.S. in 1848. Procter edited an American edition for the publisher Lea and Blanchard of Philadelphia. Procter's edition added approximately one-third new material. Procter's Practical Pharmacy was published in 1849. An Introduction to Practical Pharmacy by Edward Parrish, from the same publishers in 1855, became the standard.

Procter became professor of practical and theoretical pharmacy at the college in 1846. He believed apprenticeships were the best way to train pharmacists. Lectures were held for apprentices in the evening from October through February. His lectures covered pharmacy techniques such as maceration, percolation, and distillation followed by a discussion of drugs and preparations. He continued at the college for almost 20 years, resigning in 1866. He returned to the position in 1872 after American pharmacist Edward Parrish, who was the first president of Swarthmore College, had died. Procter died in 1874 shortly after completing a lecture at the college.

On May 3, 1941, a statue depicting Procter was constructed by American sculptor William Marks Simpson at the headquarters of the American Pharmaceutical Association.

== See also ==
- List of pharmacists
