= Harvey A.K. Whitney =

American pharmacist

- Born: November 7, 1894; Adrian, Michigan
- Died: December 15, 1957 (aged 63)
- Education: University of Michigan College of Pharmacy
- Occupation: Pharmacist

Harvey A.K. Whitney (1894-1957) was an American pharmacist. He was instrumental in the formation and was the first chairman and President of the American Society of Health-System Pharmacists, where he served from 1942 to 1943. He also co-founded The Bulletin of the ASHP in 1943 which later became the American Journal of Health-System Pharmacy. The Harvey A.K. Whitney Lecture Award, considered to be the highest award in health-system pharmacy, is named after him.

== Personal history ==
Whitney was born on November 7, 1894, in Adrian, Michigan. During high school, he worked part-time at a local drugstore. Whitney graduated high school in 1912 and in the following year, he went to work for the Rupp & Bowman Drug Company after high school. During World War I, he served in the Army Medical Corps before being honorably discharged and later attended the College of Pharmacy at the University of Michigan. He graduated in 1923 with his Ph.C. degree.

Harvey A.K. Whitney died in 1957.

== Harvey A.K. Whitney Lecture Award ==
The award was established in 1950 by the Michigan Society of Hospital Pharmacists and is considered one of the highest awards in health-system pharmacy. The award is given out annually.

== See also ==
- List of pharmacists
