= George F. Archambault =

American Pharmacist (1909-2001)

George F. Archambault, Ph.G., Ph.C., J.D. (April 29, 1909 – January 1, 2001) was the first pharmacy liaison officer for the United States Public Health Service and considered the "father of consultant pharmacy". On April 22, 1999, for his 90th birthday party, Deputy Surgeon General Kenneth P. Moritsugu proclaimed Archambault a "living treasure of the United States Public Health Service Commissioned Corps".

== Career ==
Archambault graduated from the Massachusetts College of Pharmacy with a Ph.G. in 1931 and a Ph.C. in 1933. In 1941, he received a Juris Doctor degree from Northeastern University, Boston.

Archambault taught commercial pharmacy at MCP. He began working at the Marine Hospital in the Boston town of Brighton in 1943 as a civilian, and in 1945 he joined the United States Public Health Service reserve. From 1947 to 1965, he was Chief of the Pharmacy Branch of the PHS Division of Hospitals. Archambault served as the pharmacy liaison officer to the Surgeon General of the United States from 1957 to 1965. In 1965, he became the Medicare pharmacy planning consultant to the Division of Medical Care Administration. In this role, he was responsible for writing the regulations governing pharmacy's role in Medicare and Medicaid. Archambault retired at the rank of captain in 1967 after 34 years of service to the PHS.

== Affiliations and awards ==
Archambault was a charter member of the American Society of Hospital Pharmacists (ASHP) in 1942. In 1956, he was awarded ASHP's Whitney Award. Additionally, he served as the 109th president of the American Pharmacists Association (APhA) from 1962 to 1963, earning the nickname “Number 109”. In 1969, he was rewarded the Remington Medal from the APhA. Archambault also received the Craigie Award from the American Society of Military Surgeons in 1962, which is presented for outstanding accomplishments in the advancement of professional pharmacy within the federal government. Archambault was a charter member of the American Society of Consultant Pharmacists, and its highest award is named in his honor.

== Quotations ==
"It is the pharmacist’s professional responsibility to protect the public against iatrogenesis, physician-induced injury or disease in the area of drug prescribing especially as to overdosage, incompatibilities, contraindications, and synergistic drug actions."

"It takes courage to be among the first to depart from the conventional pathways to the unblazed trails where progress is made. In such departures the "adventurer", be he an association or an individual, is often referred to as someone on 'cloud nine,' an idealist, and often too, he meets with the outright hostility of his colleagues who do not want the status quo changed. These objectors, the truly unrealistic ones, are those who never learn history's one important lesson: namely, 'nothing is permanent but change'."

== See also ==
- List of pharmacists
