= Wilbur Scoville =

American pharmacist (1865–1942)

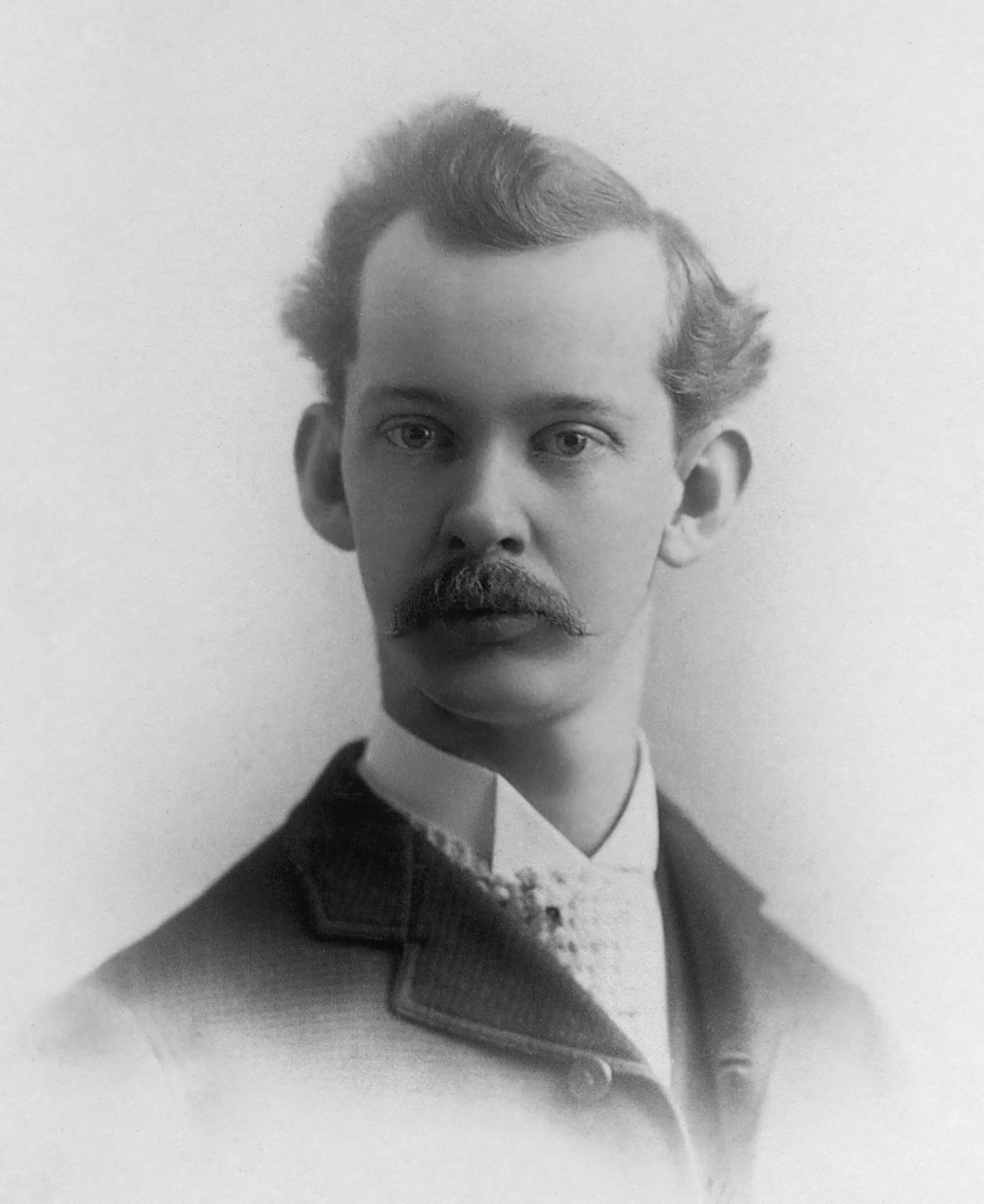
- Scoville in 1910
- Born: January 22, 1865; Bridgeport, Connecticut, U.S.
- Died: March 10, 1942 (aged 77); Gainesville, Florida, U.S.
- Occupation: Pharmacist

Wilbur Lincoln Scoville (January 22, 1865 – March 10, 1942) was an American pharmacist best known for his creation of the "Scoville Organoleptic Test", standardized as the Scoville scale. He devised the test and scale in 1912 while working at the Parke-Davis pharmaceutical company to measure pungency, "spiciness" or "capsaicin concentration" of various chili peppers.

== Early life ==
Scoville was born in Bridgeport, Connecticut, on January 22, 1865. He married Cora B. Upham on September 1, 1891, in Wollaston (Quincy, Massachusetts). They had two daughters: Amy Augusta, born August 21, 1892, and Ruth Upham, born October 21, 1897.

== Career ==
Scoville wrote The Art of Compounding, which was first published in 1895 and has gone through at least 8 editions. The book was used as a pharmacological reference up until the 1960s, also making one of the earliest mentions of milk as an antidote for pepper heat. Scoville also wrote Extracts and Perfumes, which contained hundreds of formulations.

For a time he was a professor at the Massachusetts College of Pharmacy and Health Sciences. In 1912, he devised the test and scale known as the "Scoville Organoleptic Test" while working at the Parke-Davis pharmaceutical company. While using human testers, it measured pungency, or "spiciness", of various chili peppers. The system was standardized as the Scoville scale.

== Death ==
Scoville died of unknown causes on March 10, 1942, in Gainesville, Florida at the age of 77.

== Awards ==
In 1922, Scoville won the Ebert prize from the American Pharmaceutical Association, which is given to "recognize the author(s) of the best report of original investigation of a medicinal substance." In 1929, he received the Remington Honor Medal, the APhA's top award. Scoville also received an honorary Doctor of Science from Columbia University in 1929.

== See also ==
- List of pharmacists
