= J. Richard Wuest =

American pharmacist (1937–2026)

J. Richard Wuest (December 14, 1937 – September 24, 2026) was an American pharmacist and academic who was a professor at the University of Cincinnati. He was instrumental in developing the Pharmex modern auxiliary warning label system and professional to patient communication.

Picture of J. Richard Wuest

== Early life and Education ==
Wuest was born on December 14, 1937, during his childhood, he attended St. Lawrence and St. Martians Grade school.

In high school, Wuest attended Elder High School, during this life he was considered a proud supporter of this school. His dedication showed with donations to the school.

in 1958, Wuest graduated from the University of Cincinnati with a Bachelors degree in pharmacy. In 1968 Wuest received a Masters degree in Science in Hospital Pharmacy Administration. In 1971, he received in doctorate in pharmacy.

Wuest graduated with first class of pharmacist students at the University of Cincinnati.

== Career and recognition ==
In 1960, Wuest joined the United Stated Air Force. due to his performance, he was promoted as staff sergeant, as well because of his performance, he was awarded a commission from the outstanding airman commission program.

Wuest joined the University of Cincinnati James L. Winkel college of pharmacy in the 1960s, becoming one of the early faculty members to expand clinical pharmacy education in Ohio. During his time as a professor, Wuest was nicknamed, Mr. Ohio pharmacy. Wuest retired in 2001. Wuest educated over 2600 students at the University of Cincinnati, Wuest also helped with the development of the national licensure exam, in which the National Association of Boards of Pharmacy awarded him for.

Wuest wrote a study on drug safety in 1982, and contributed to 500 educational documents. He also co authored a document called "The Family Guide to Prescription Drugs." This document emphasized professional to patient communication within pharmacy.

In honor of his work, Wuest received the William Howard Taft Medal for Notable Achievement, he also received 8 academic excellence awards.

In 2012, the University of Cincinnati dedicated the J. Richard Wuest Family Pharmacy Practice Skills Center to Wuest and his family. Wuest made a donation of $500,000 to the completion of the room. The room is located in the Kowalewski Hall at the University of Cincinnati medical campus.

Wuest was known for his humor, famously making a joke at 2011 while receiving the William Howard Taft Medal for Notable Achievement the joke stated was, “Then the skeleton sits up and asks the pharmacist: ‘Hey doc, can you give me something to stop this coffin?’” Wuest dedicates his humor to his Irish heritage and his short stature, jokingly saying it was “survival among older, bigger young men.”

The Wuest Family Pharmacy Practice Fund is named after him.

== Personal life ==
Wuest married his first wife, Mary Virginia Lange Wuest, in 1961, after her death, Wuest married Carol Ann Vogele Wuest, and had three children. Catherine Kwiatkowski, Diana Wuest, Susan Hurley, Jason Douglas Wuest, David Wuest and Patrick Wuest. after some time, J.R and Carol had a divorce.

in 2001, Wuest married his third and final wife, Suzanne Eastman. With that, he inherited stepchildren by the name Erica Eastman and Chris Eastman.

Wuest was known for having plenty of memorabilia is his possession. He had University of Cincinnati sports memorabilia including signed basketballs and a signed helmet from the 2010 Allstate Sugar Bowl. Wuest also had a collection of apothecary tools including mortars and pestles.

Wuest was described as a humble man, reportedly living in a humble 2 story brick house, Wuest also attended many University of Cincinnati sporting events, notably going to all home events for football and basketball.

== Auxiliary warning label system ==
Wuest's most notable accomplishment was developing the Pharmex colored modern auxiliary warning label system.

Wuest developed and copyrighted the colored labels in the 1970's. During this development, Wuest connected with the company Pharmex, and with him and his team of pharmacists, he created the labels. He and his team also created a chart a chart explaining which label went on which drug.

These labels included information and warning and clear warning labels. These labels are now widely used in 4 billion prescription bottles.

== Death ==
Wuest died in Cincinnati, Ohio, on September 24, 2026, at the age of 88, His funeral service was held at St. Lawrence church in Price Hill.

== See also ==
- Pharmacist
- List of inventors
- List of pharmacists
- University of Cincinnati
