= AHFS Drug Information Book =

Drug compendium published by ASHP

The AHFS DI is one of several compendiums approved by the Social Security Act (Section 1861(t)(2)(B)(ii)(I)) as a source of off-label anti-cancer drug use. It was originally published in 1959 as the American Hospital Formulary Service (AHFS) by the American Society of Health-System Pharmacists.

It is also the only one left of the originally authorized compendiums.
