= American Society of Consultant Pharmacists =

International professional association

The Consultant Pharmacist
- Discipline: Pharmacy
- Language: English
- Edited by: H. Edward Davidson

Publication details
- History: 1986–present
- Publisher: American Society of Consultant Pharmacists (United States)
- Frequency: Monthly

Standard abbreviations
- ISO 4: Consult. Pharm.

Indexing
- ISSN: 0888-5109
- OCLC no.: 13623012

Links
- Journal homepage; Online archive

The American Society of Consultant Pharmacists (ASCP) is an international professional association that provides education, advocacy, and resources to advance the practice of senior care pharmacy, and that represents the interests of consultant pharmacists who work with elderly patients.

== History ==
The organization is based in Alexandria, Virginia and was founded in 1969 by several consultant pharmacists including George F. Archambault and R. Tim Webster. It holds two major conventions each year, and hosts numerous other events for health care professionals.

== Description ==
The American Society of Consultant Pharmacists Foundation is an 501(c)(3) charitable organization affiliated with the American Society of Consultant Pharmacists. It is also headquartered in Alexandria, Virginia.

The mission of the Foundation is "to foster appropriate, effective, and safe medication use in older persons." It sponsors research, administers programs, holds traineeships in pharmacy practice (particularly consultant pharmacy practice), and performs other educational and outreach functions.

== Publications ==
ASCP publishes The Consultant Pharmacist, a monthly peer-reviewed medical journal indexed in MEDLINE. ASCP also publishes books, websites, and reference materials for health care professionals.

== See also ==
- Commission for Certification in Geriatric Pharmacy – Certification authority started by ASCP
