= John Michael Maisch =

United States pharmacist

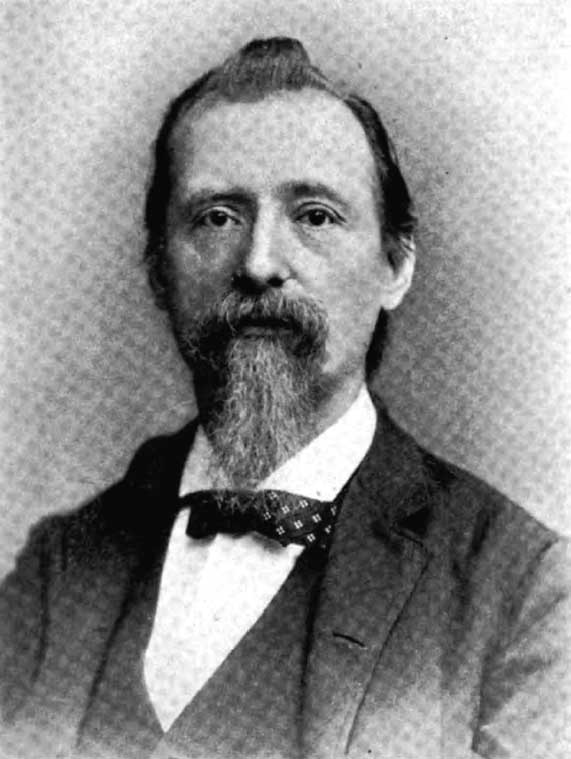
- Born: January 30, 1831; Hanau, Germany
- Died: September 10, 1893 (aged 62); Philadelphia, Pennsylvania, United States

John Michael Maisch (January 30, 1831 – September 10, 1893) was a United States pharmacist, the "father of adequate pharmaceutical legislation."

== Biography ==
=== Germany ===
John Michael Maisch was born in Hanau, Germany, the son of Conrad Maisch, a merchant. He received his early education in the free schools of Hanau. When he was 12, his parents apprenticed him to a goldsmith. This only lasted three days since school officials disapproved and demanded his return to academic studies. One of his teachers introduced him to the study of mineralogy and microscopy, and he did practical fieldwork in the Hanau vicinity. He conceived an ambition for a university education. He was at first inclined toward theology, but an increasing interest in natural science led him to devote himself to scientific studies. His devotion to his studies was such that his health became undermined, and he was obliged to give up his close application to study as well as his ambition for a university education.

He joined the military service of Hesse and imbibed the revolutionary ideas circulating among the soldiers at that time. Feeling the inconsistency of his situation, he left the military for the Turners and joined them in promulgating revolutionary ideas in the Main River valley. This resulted in him being arrested in Sinsheim and sentenced to four and a half years imprisonment at hard labor. With the help of friends, he escaped.

=== United States ===
He emigrated to the United States in 1849, and initially worked in a factory in Baltimore, Maryland. His interest in natural science led him to become acquainted with two doctors, Wiss and Vogler, who helped him study pharmacy, and he was employed in a drug store owned by Wiss. When that store was sold, he became a clerk in Washington, D.C., then Philadelphia (1853), then New York City and again, in 1856, in Philadelphia, when he also became an instructor at Edward Parrish's School of Practical Pharmacy. In Philadelphia, one of his employers was Robert Shoemaker, a pioneer wholesale druggist and manufacturing pharmacist. Maisch aided in the inspection of the roots, barks, leaves, chemicals, etc., that came into the store. He published his first paper, "On the Adulteration of Drugs and Chemical Preparations," in the American Journal of Pharmacy in May 1854.

In 1861, he returned to New York City to be professor of materia medica and pharmacy in the New York College of Pharmacy and work in the laboratory of Edward R. Squibb. In 1863, at the height of the American Civil War, he organized and was chief chemist of the U. S. Army laboratory in Philadelphia at Sixth and Oxford Streets. This laboratory realized savings of approximately $1,000,000 for the government during the war.

=== Philadelphia ===
In 1866, after the war had ended, he opened a pharmacy at 1607 Ridge Avenue in Philadelphia, and joined the faculty of the Philadelphia College of Pharmacy. In 1867, he became professor of materia medica and botany at the College. Maisch sold his pharmacy in 1871, when he also became editor of the American Journal of Pharmacy, a position he held for 22 years. In 1871, he also received the degrees of Phar.M. and Phar.D. from the Maryland College of Pharmacy. From 1870 to 1881, he had charge of the chemical laboratory at the Philadelphia College of Pharmacy. He was very active in the American Pharmaceutical Association, and its permanent secretary from 1865 until his death, having charge of the editing of its annual volume of proceedings. He was also one of the committee of revision of the "U. S. Pharmacopœia."

He actively sought legislation regulating pharmacists and pharmacies. After completing a survey in 1868 which showed almost a complete absence of such legislation, in 1869 he formulated a model law for state legislatures. By 1900 such laws could be found practically everywhere.

He was elected to membership in the American Philosophical Society on January 18, 1884. His entreaties resulted in the founding of the Pennsylvania Pharmaceutical Association.

He died at his home in Philadelphia on September 10, 1893.

At his funeral, there were representatives from the Philadelphia College of Pharmacy; the Pennsylvania Pharmaceutical Association; Mt. Moriah Lodge, No. 155, F. and A. M.; Covenant Lodge, No. 114, I. O. O. F.; Cleomenes Senate, No. 14, Order of Sparta; Harmony Chapter, No. 52, Royal Arch Masons; Quaker City Lodge, No. 116, A. O. U. W.; and Deutsche Pionier Verein. Interment was at Chelton Hills, and the body was cremated.

In 1859, he married Charlotte Justine Kuhl, a niece of Heinrich Kuhl. A widow, five sons and two daughters survived him.

== Publications ==
His original investigations in technical pharmacy were numerous, and treated improved processes of analysis, botanical methods, and chemical researches. For the most part, his research was published in the American Journal of Pharmacy. Other publications:

- Griffith's Universal Formulary, editor (3d ed., Philadelphia, 1874)
- The National Dispensatory, with Alfred M. Stillé (4 eds., 1879-86). Stillé, a physician, did the medical part, and Maisch wrote the chemical, botanical, pharmaceutical and materia medica part.
- A Manual of Organic Materia Medica (at least 5 eds., 1882–1892).
- G. H. E. Muhlenberg als Botaniker (1886)
