= Gloria Niemeyer Francke =

American pharmacist

- Born: April 28, 1922; Dillsboro, Indiana
- Died: August 3, 2008 (aged 86)
- Education: Purdue University, University of Cincinnati

Gloria Niemeyer Francke (April 28, 1922 – August 3, 2008) was an American pharmacist. She became assistant director of the American Pharmacists Association (APhA) Division of Hospital Pharmacy (1946–1956); executive secretary of the American Society of Hospital Pharmacists (1949–1960); and research associate for the Audit of Pharmaceutical Service in Hospitals (1956–1964).

A native of Dillsboro, Indiana, Gloria Niemeyer earned her B.S. degree in Pharmacy from Purdue University in 1942 and her Pharm.D in 1971 from the University of Cincinnati.

She then served as a drug literature specialist at the National Library of Medicine (1965–1967); as a clinical pharmacy teaching coordinator for the Veterans Administration Hospital in Cincinnati (1967–1971); as secretary of the American Institute of the History of Pharmacy (1968–1978); and as Chief of the program evaluation branch in the Alcohol and Drug Dependence Service, Veterans Administration (1971–1975).

She rejoined the APhA staff (1975–1985) and was elected Honorary President in 1986 and received the Remington Honor Medal in 1987.

She served as a member of the APhA Foundation Advisory Committee. The society's Gloria Niemeyer Francke Leadership Mentor Award is named for her.

Francke became the first executive secretary of the American Society of Health-System Pharmacists [ASHP] in 1949 and was Associate Editor of the American Journal of Hospital Pharmacy from 1944 to 1964.

In 1995, Francke was awarded the Donald Francke Medal by the American Society of Hospital Pharmacists for "significant international contributions to advance pharmacy practice."

== Journalism and publications ==
Francke's journalistic achievements include:

- Assistant editor of the Journal of the American Pharmaceutical Association, 1946–1947
- Associate editor of the American Journal of Hospital Pharmacy, 1944–1964
- Co-author of Mirror to Hospital Pharmacy (1964) and Perspectives in Clinical Pharmacy (1972)

== Marriage ==
She was married to Donald E. Francke, who founded Drug Intelligence (now Annals of Pharmacotherapy). Following his death in 1978, she became the owner of Drug Intelligence Publications.
