= Edward Parrish =

American pharmacist and college president (1822–1872)

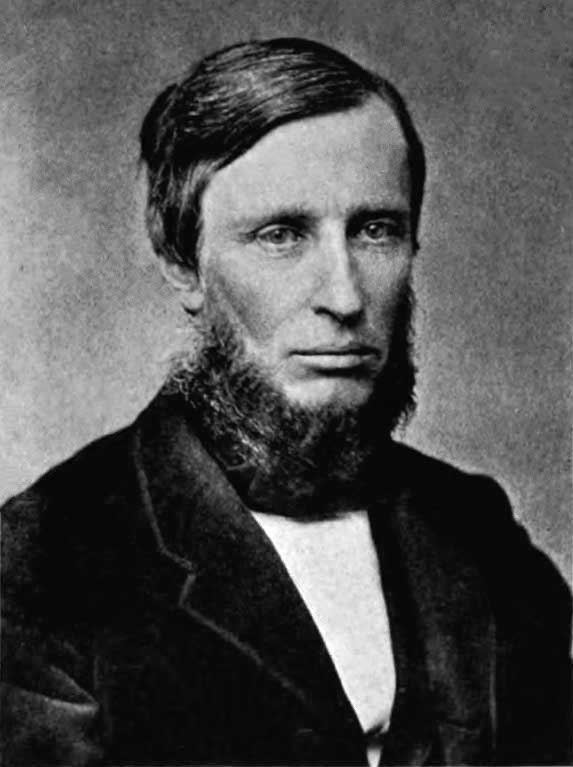

President of Swarthmore College
- In office 1865–1871
- Succeeded by: Edward Hicks Magill

Personal details
- Born: May 31, 1822 Philadelphia, Pennsylvania
- Died: September 9, 1872 (aged 50) Fort Sill, Oklahoma
- Profession: Pharmacist

Edward Parrish (May 31, 1822 – September 9, 1872) was an American pharmacist. He was the first president of Swarthmore College.

== Biography ==
Parrish was the son of Philadelphia physician Joseph Parrish (1779–1840). He studied at a Friends' school, and graduated from the Philadelphia College of Pharmacy in 1842. After a course of training at his brother Dillwyn's shop (located at the southwest corner of Eighth and Arch Streets in Philadelphia), in 1843 he purchased a drug store at the northwest corner of Ninth and Chestnut Streets and began his practice. He was elected to membership in the College of Pharmacy in 1843, in 1845 a trustee, and in 1854 secretary of the College. He was appointed professor of materia medica in 1864, and in 1867 exchanged his chair with John Michael Maisch, taking that of practical pharmacy, on which branch he continued to lecture until his death.

Parrish's shop was located close to the University of Pennsylvania, and in his discussions with the professors there he became impressed with the belief that students from all parts of the United States were coming to Philadelphia to study medicine and were leaving without a knowledge of pharmacy. Many of these medical practitioners were returning to small towns and villages where there were no apothecaries, and their want of knowledge of pharmacy was a loss to themselves and a disadvantage to their communities. Thus in the fall of 1849, Parrish established a school of practical pharmacy at his shop whose curriculum was addressed especially to medical students. After a few years, when he sold his shop to enter into a partnership with his brother Dillwyn, the school was moved to the premises of Dillwyn's shop. By 1857, he had instructed 299 medical students from almost every state in the United States.

Parrish was active in the movement that led to the founding of Swarthmore College, and was its first president 1868-1870. In August 1872, he was appointed commissioner to the Indians with a view toward establishing peace, but he was attacked by malarial fever and died.

== Works ==
His contributions to the American Journal of Pharmacy are more than 40 in number. He also published:

- An Introduction to Practical Pharmacy (Philadelphia, 1856; 1859 ed.) By 1900, this book had passed through five editions.
- The Phantom Bouquet, a Popular Treatise on the Art of Skeletonizing Leaves and Seed Vessels, and adapting them to Embellish the Home of Taste (1863)
- A Treatise on Pharmacy: Designed as a Text-Book for the Student, and as a Guide for the Physician and Pharmaceutist (1864)
- An Essay on Education (1866)
