= Elizabeth Topp =

American pharmaceutical scientist

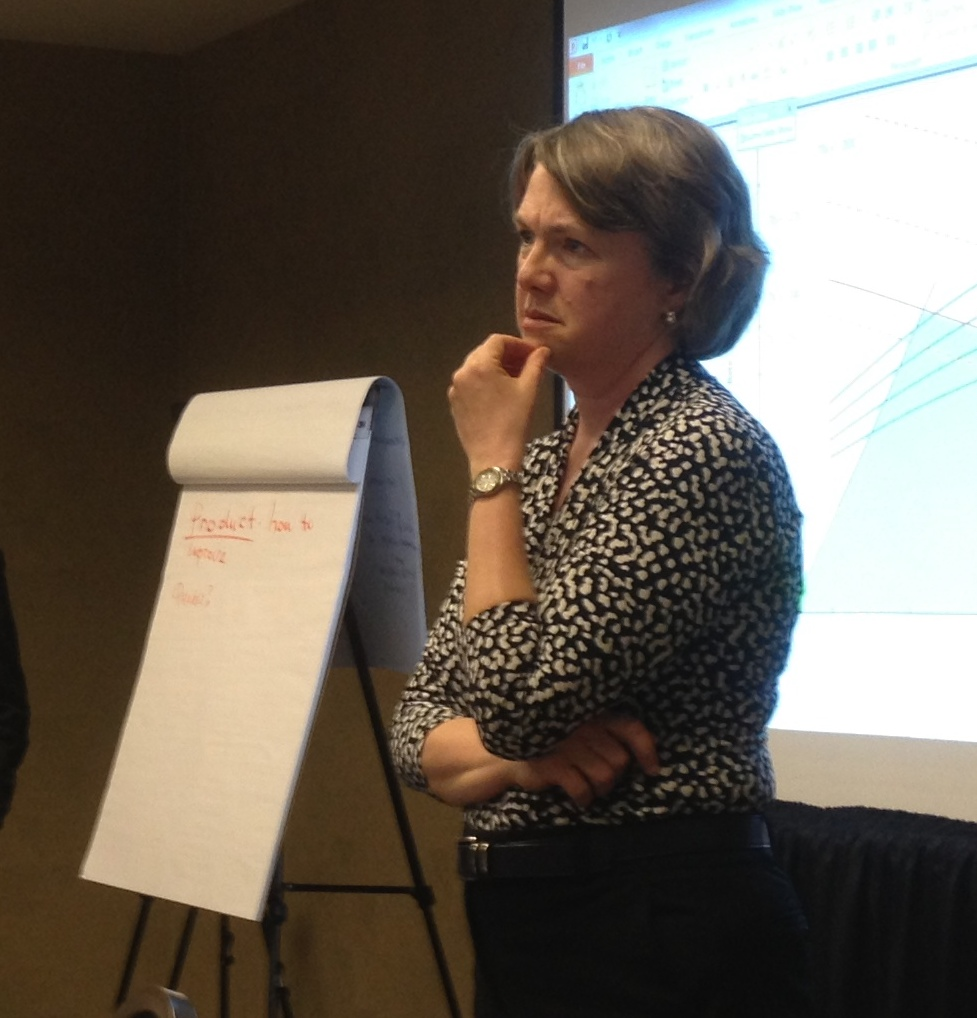
- Education: University of Delaware, University of Michigan
- Scientific career
- Fields: Pharmaceutics; Protein stability
- Workplaces: Purdue University
- Thesis: A Physiological Flow Model for the Gastrointestinal Absorption and Plasma Kinetics of Aspirin (1986)
- Doctoral advisor: Gordon Amidon

Elizabeth Murphy Topp is an American pharmaceutical scientist and educator known for her work in solid‐state chemical stability of proteins and peptides. In 2000s Topp introduced solid-state hydrogen-deuterium exchange as the method for stability characterization of lyophilized biopharmaceutical formulations. She is the Chief Scientific Officer at National Institute of Bioprocessing Research and Training (NIBRT) in Dublin, Ireland since September 2019. Topp was on the faculty at the University of Kansas Department of Pharmaceutical Chemistry from 1986 to 2009. She has been the Head and Dane O. Kildsig Chair at the Department of Industrial and Physical Chemistry at Purdue University College of Pharmacy from 2009 to 2017. Topp has been elected a fellow of American Association of Pharmaceutical Scientists in 2010 for "making sustained remarkable scholarly and research contributions to the pharmaceutical sciences". In 2015 Topp co-founded, with Alina Alexeenko, an industry-university consortium LyoHUB for advancing pharmaceutical lyophilization technology.

Topp earned her B.S. in Chemical Engineering form the University of Delaware, M.E. in Chemical and Biochemical Engineering from the University of Pennsylvania and a Ph.D. in Pharmaceutics from University of Michigan.
