= Home medicines review (Australia) =

Australian scheme for community-setting treatment

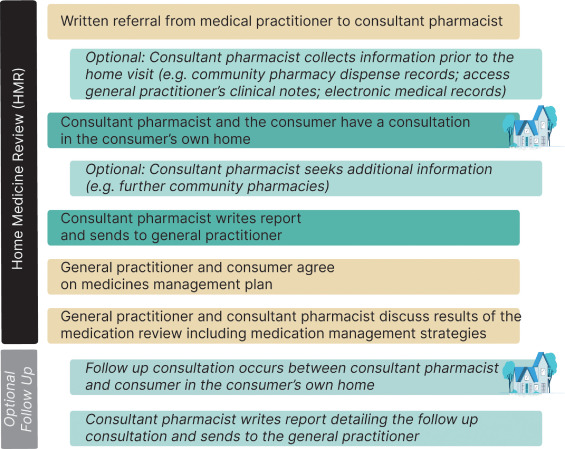
Figure 1: The Home Medicine Review process

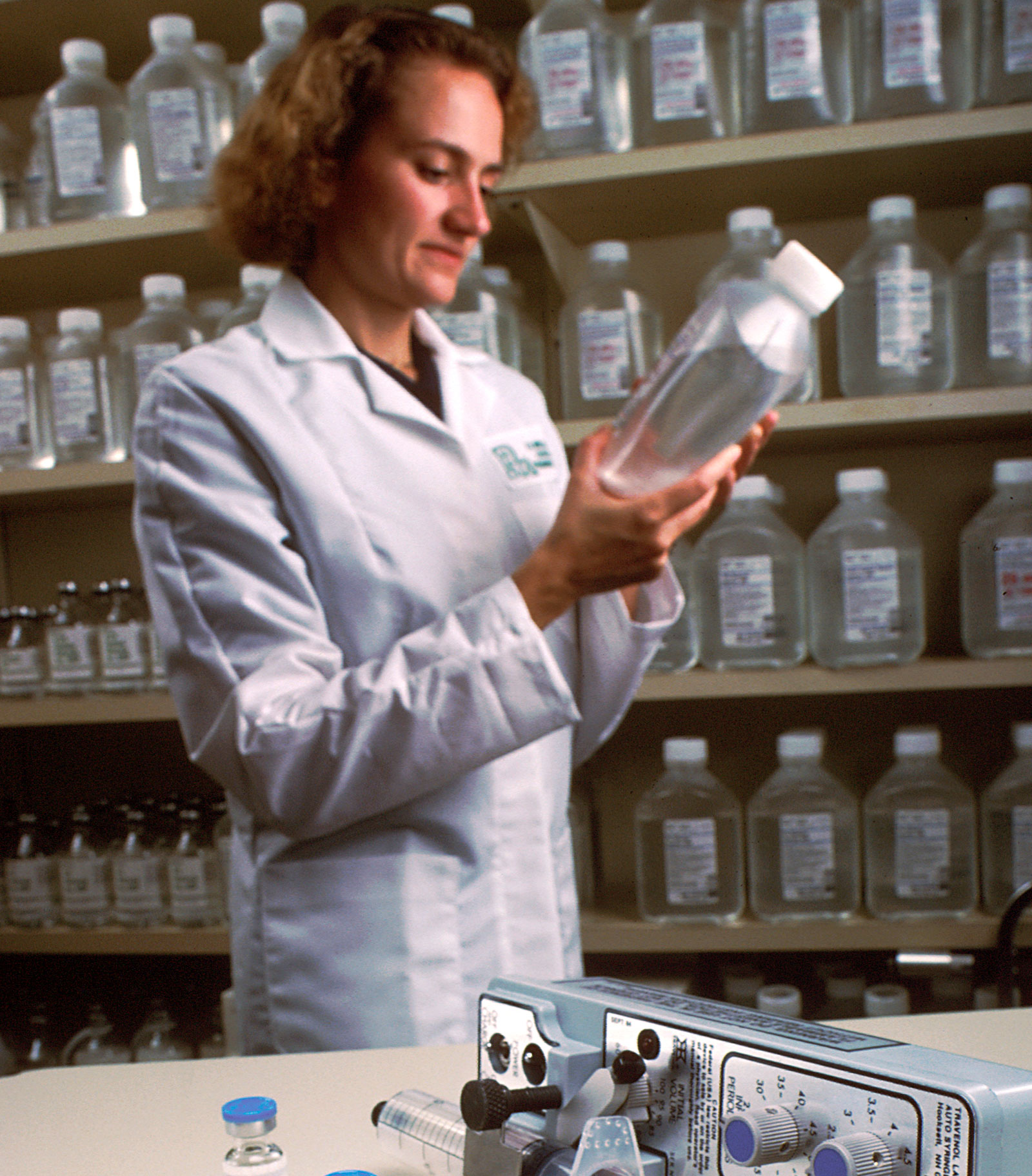
Pharmacists usually assist the patient with reviewing the medication needed. Credit: Bill Branson (Photographer)

The Domiciliary Medication Management Review (DMMR), also named as a Home Medicines Review (HMR), in an Australian scheme for the patients residing in community setting. There are many steps included in a Home Medicine Review Service (Figure 1).

Introduced in 2001 into the Medicare Benefits Schedule (MBS) as item 900, it is aimed at preventative care.

Following an assessment of the patient's needs, a medication management plan is made.

Pharmacists must be credentialled as consultant pharmacists before they can be remunerated for Medication Management Reviews.

== See also ==
Consultant Pharmacist
