= Paul Jean Rigollot =

French pharmacist

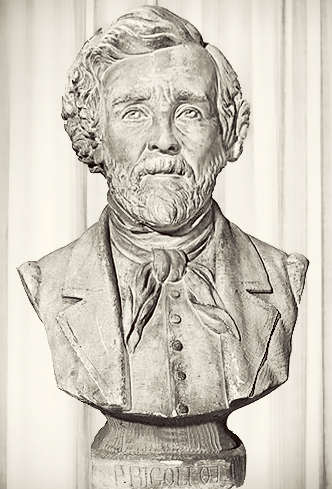
Paul Jean Rigollot (1810-1873)

Paul Jean Rigollot (12 May 1810, Saint-Étienne - 12 March 1873, Paris), was a French pharmacist.

In 1866 he invented the “Paper Rigollot”, poultice made from black mustard deoiled used to facilitate breathing during respiratory disease. The invention was shown at the Universal Exhibition in 1867. It was adopted by the Paris hospitals, military hospitals and the British and French Navy.

In 1872, he directed the poultice plant of Fontenay-sous-Bois.

== Family ==
Paul Jean Rigollot was the son of Gratien, gunsmith, and Marie Philibert. He was the grandson of Paul Rigollot, officer of Health Master Surgeon.

He married Sophie Marie Alexia Troyon. They have one daughter who married Auguste Frémont, lawyer and friend of Léon Gambetta.

His sister Pierrette Sophie married Dr. François Bourgaud, who succeeded Paul Rigollot (the grandfather of Paul Jean) as Master Surgeon.

== Biography ==
In 1825, he successfully continued his studies at the School of Pharmacy of Paris. He then returned to his shop in Saint-Étienne. He invented a gas regulator and a firedamp detector which were not retained by the manufacturers.

In 1849, his experiences swallowed up proceeds from the sale of his pharmacy. Penniless, he returned to Paris. During the French coup of 1851, he was imprisoned a few days with the sculptor David d'Angers, who became his friend.

In 1853, Émile-Justin Menier (Menier Chocolate) moved the family pharmacy in Saint-Denis and placed Paul Jean Rigollot. In 1860, the pharmacist Boggio imagined the mustard plaster in sheets, and Menier launched into rubber production: Paul Jean Rigollot worked and improved the sheets by using a rubber adhesive solution.

He died in 1873 in Paris. He was buried in Asnois, Nièvre, where his bust with the epitaph: “Savant disinterested one aim, to relieve humanity otherwise it was a hundred other celebrities”.

Chocolate has generated much interest among pharmacists, as a tidbit but as an excipient. Paul Jean Rigollot has worked extensively with the firm Menier, was cited in an 1896 book, The Science of Advertising: a huge amount of chocolate that had turned white because of cooling, the sale was compromised. He had the clever idea to print a new ad: “Chocolat Menier, the only one who whitens with age”. The entire production was sold, and had to try to reproduce the phenomenon for the following productions.
