= Sara Borrell Ruiz =

Spanish scientist (1917–1999)

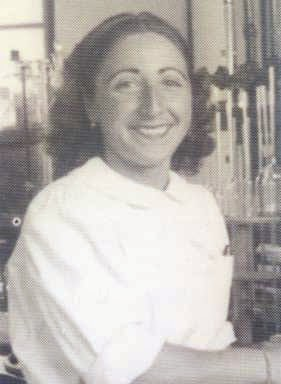
- Born: 1917; Madrid, Spain
- Died: 1999 (aged 81–82); Madrid, Spain
- Education: University of Madrid
- Known for: Pioneering work on analysis and metabolism of steroid hormones

Sara Borrell Ruiz (1917-1999) was a Spanish scientist, pharmacist and biochemist known for her work on the analysis and metabolism of steroid hormones and one of the first experts on sex hormones in Spain.

== Early life and education ==
Sara Borrell Ruiz was born in Madrid and grew up there with her proclaimed liberal family. Her father was imprisoned at the end of the Spanish Civil War due to his ties with the left-wing party, Izquierda Republicana.

Early on, Borrel tried to study agricultural engineering but was denied as she was a women. She decided to study pharmacy and speciliazed in endocrinology at the University of Madrid in 1933. The university was closed during the war, however she was able to graduate in 1940 and eventually obtained her PhD and degree honours in 1944 for her research on the composition of the waters of the Tajo River.

In 1946, under the advice of then secretary-general of the Consejo Superior de Investigaciones Científicas (CSIC), José María Albareda, Borrell became a postdoctoral student at the Hanna Dairy Research Institute in Ayr, Scotland to study milk proteins under Norman C. Wright, which eventually led Borrell to her interest in hormones.

== Scientific career ==
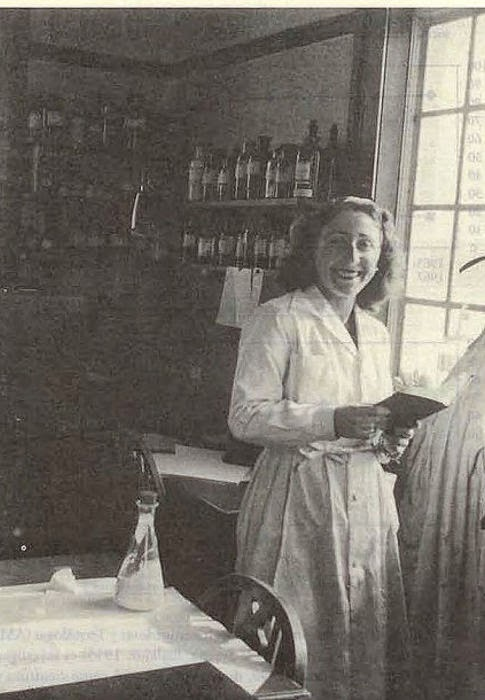
Sara Borrell Ruiz

When she returned to Spain, Borrell was appointed assistant professor of Bromatology at the University of Madrid in 1941 and resigned in 1949 to become a researcher at the CSIC. The Institute of Experimental Endocrinology was established at CSIC a year later which she joined to do research on the biochemistry of hormones.

Upon this, Borrell traveled to the US to research estrogen and other sex hormones in the 1950s. She worked at the Dunn Nutritional Laboratory on chromatography, specifically about the determination of adrenal corticosteroids and the chromatographic separation of 17-ketosteroids. In 1953, with a grant from the Institute of International Education, she continued her research at the Worcester Foundation for Experimental Biology in Massachusetts with Gregory Pincus and Clark Hoagland. There, she studied steroid metabolism in humans and cats.

In 1963, she was in charge of the steroid section at the Gregorio Marañón Institute and later in the year, became a founding member of the Spanish Society of Biochemistry (SEB).

In 1983, she became a professor of neuroendocrinology at the Cajal Institute where she researched the metabolism of adrenal hormones in different animals until her retirement in 1989.

== Legacy ==
Her research on hormone analysis was published by the Nature, Journal of Clinical Endocrinology and Metabolism, the Biochemical Journal, the Journal of Endocrinology and Hormone Research.

The Carlos III Health Institute named to a grant program of postdoctoral training after her.
