= Sabina Baldoncelli =

Italian pharmacist

- Born: Sabitina Balducelli c. 1781; Bologna, Italy
- Education: University of Bologna
- Occupation: Pharmacist
- Known for: Italian female pharmacist with university degree

Sabina Baldoncelli (b. c. 1781) was an Italian orphan who was trained in her Bologna orphanage by the pharmacist Margherita Trippi. She went on to earn a degree in pharmacy from the University of Bologna and became a practicing pharmacist, but was allowed to do so only at the orphanage where she grew up.

== Life and work ==
Baldoncelli was born in Bologna as Sabitina Balducelli in 1781 or 1782, but after her father died, when she was 12 or 13, the family suffered economic woes and her mother remarried, resulting in Sabina being sent to the orphanage of the Putte dei Mendicanti di S. Caterina.

After she arrived at the orphanage, a pharmacy was established to accommodate the needs of orphans as well as other area residents. The pharmacy was run by Margherita Trippi, who had passed a pharmaceutical review by the University of Bologna's College of Medicine in April 1796, and who began teaching pharmaceutical chemistry to Baldoncelli. Trippi had not qualified for a university degree because she was a woman, but a week after finishing her university studies, she "received the approval of the College of Medicine and her license to practice in a ceremony at the church of S. Matteo, with no restriction placed on her practice."

After working and studying with Trippi for three years, Baldoncelli moved on to study with university professors: pharmaceuticals and general chemistry from Francesco Maria Coli, medicine with Professor Ungarelli and botany with Professor Scannagatta. It appears that Trippi was instrumental in making those studies possible. At the conclusion of Baldoncelli's successful studies, she had completed her coursework sufficiently to obtain a university degree in pharmacy.

As Baldoncelli herself stressed in her 1807 petition to the Royal Directorate of Public Instruction at Milan, she had received the same education that male pharmacy students received at the university. One should also note that she had had three years of practical experience, which most male students probably lacked.

Authorities in Milan authorized Baldoncelli to take the university examinations in pharmacy because she was a special case, an orphan, who lived in an orphanage. However there was a considerable restriction placed on her future work, she would only be allowed to practice pharmaceutical chemistry in the orphanage and not in secular pharmacies. Therefore, she was not allowed to practice elsewhere in Bologna even if she wanted to. Male pharmacists did not have similar restrictions placed upon their places of work.

The Napoleonic era degree requirements of the time were threefold. They mandated that she had to complete a year of practice at the orphanage's pharmacy and she did so under the supervision of both Trippi and Coli. Then Baldoncelli "carried out the experimental part of her examination in December 1808 at the chemical laboratories of the university in the presence of her teacher Coli and another pharmacist. Finally, the oral part of the examination took place a few days later, when she had to answer questions in botany, materia medica, chemistry, pharmaceutical chemistry, and practical pharmacy."

She received her university degree in 1809 and practiced in the orphanage's pharmacy. Thereafter, the names of Baldoncelli and Trippi both appeared regularly in the list of qualified pharmacists for the Bologna region. For the 1829 list, however, Baldoncelli's name disappeared and Trippi's name remained but it is thought that the list was merely incomplete. For the 1833 list, Baldoncelli and Trippi are both included, but in 1846, neither name appears.

== External sources ==
- Frize M. (2013) After Laura Bassi: Women in Science and Health Careers in Nineteenth Century Italy. In: Laura Bassi and Science in 18th Century Europe. Springer, Berlin, Heidelberg. https://doi.org/10.1007/978-3-642-38685-5_11
