= Aziza Ouahchi =

Tunisian pharmacist and professional leader

- Born: Aziza Ben Cherifa; 22 January 1933; Sousse, Tunisia
- Died: 27 June 1993 (aged 60); Sousse, Tunisia
- Other names: Aziza Ouahchi Ben Cherifa; Aziza Ben Cherifa épouse Ouahchi
- Occupation: Pharmacist
- Known for: President of the National Council of the Order of Pharmacists of Tunisia; executive of the Compagnie tunisienne pharmaceutique

Aziza Ouahchi (née Aziza Ben Cherifa; 22 January 1933 – 27 June 1993) was a Tunisian pharmacist, executive of the Compagnie tunisienne pharmaceutique (COTUPHA), and president of the National Council of the Order of Pharmacists of Tunisia.

== Biography ==
Ben Cherifa studied pharmacy in Paris and also obtained certificates in biology. In 1963, she opened a biological analysis laboratory in Sousse.

In 1966, she became manager of the Compagnie tunisienne pharmaceutique (COTUPHA), later serving as its chief executive until her death. She was president of the company from 1987 to 1993.

In the early 1970s, during the reorganization of the pharmacy profession in Tunisia, Mohamed Mzali mentioned her as vice-president of the provisional committee in charge of the profession. A biographical article on Radhi Jazi in Leaders also listed her among the figures involved in the restructuring of the profession and the expansion of its legislative framework.

At the electoral general assembly of 11 December 1976, she was elected president of the National Council of the Order of Pharmacists of Tunisia. She held the office until May 1990, serving for nearly fourteen years and being re-elected five consecutive times. During her presidency, the Order took part in the development of several regulatory texts relating to pharmacy practice, pharmacy opening hours, the status of hospital pharmacists, and the general organization of the profession.

She also served as president of the Société des sciences pharmaceutiques de Tunisie, the Federation of Maghreb Pharmacists, and the Union of Arab Pharmacists.

According to COTUPHA, she also served as a member of the National Assembly and was among the early members of a Tunisian human-rights association.

She died on 27 June 1993.

== Honours ==
She received several Tunisian and foreign distinctions, including the Arab Pharmacist Medal, the Legion of Honour, and the ranks of Knight and Officer of the Order of the Tunisian Republic.

== Legacy ==
Tunisian press reports in 2018 and 2019 mentioned a tribute by the municipality of Sousse to several local figures, including Aziza Ben Cherifa épouse Ouahchi, for whom a street was named.
