= Mark Cushman =

American chemist

Mark S. Cushman is an American chemist, whose primary research is in the area of medicinal chemistry. He completed his pre-pharmacy studies at Fresno State College (now California State University, Fresno) in 1965. He then attended the University of California San Francisco (as a University of California Regents Scholar), earning a Pharm.D. in 1969 and a Ph.D. in Medicinal Chemistry in 1973. Thereafter, he performed postdoctoral training in the laboratory of George Büchi, Ph.D., at the Massachusetts Institute of Technology (MIT). There, his research focused on the discovery and development of new synthetic methodologies, and the isolation and structural characterization of mycotoxins from Aspergillus niger. In 1975, he joined the Department of Medicinal Chemistry and Molecular Pharmacology (at the time, Department of Medicinal Chemistry and Pharmacognosy) at Purdue University. From 1983 to 1984, Prof. Cushman was a Senior Fulbright Scholar at Munich Technical University working in the laboratory of Professor Adelbert Bacher. His sabbatical work dealt with the design and synthesis of probes to elucidate key aspects of the biosynthesis of riboflavin (vitamin B_{2}). Currently he holds the rank of Distinguished Professor Emeritus of Medicinal Chemistry at Purdue University. He has mentored 40 graduate students, 59 postdoctoral researchers, and 5 visiting scholars. He has published 351 papers and holds 44 patents. His work has ~20,500 citations with an h-index of 78. His most cited papers had 658, 468, and 336 citations as of July 2026. He has made seminal contributions to the fields of synthetic and medicinal chemistry including the development of new synthetic methodologies, the synthesis of natural products, and the preparation of antivirals, antibacterials, and anticancer agents, and mechanism probes to understand the function of over forty macromolecular targets. One of his main scientific contributions is the development of the indenoisoquinolines, molecules that inhibit the action of toposiomerase I (Top1) and stabilize the G-quadruplex in the Myc promoter. Three indenoisoquinolines designed and synthesized by his research group at Purdue University [indotecan (LMP 400), indimitecan (LMP 776), and LMP 744] demonstrated potent anticancer activity in vivo and have completed phase I clinical trials at the National Institutes of Health.

== Personal life ==
Mark Cushman was born on August 20, 1945, in the city of Fresno, California. A main influence during his formative years was his maternal grandfather, Stanley Borleske, who taught engineering and mathematics at Fresno State College. Mr. Borleske also worked as head football, basketball, and baseball coach at Fresno State College. Besides instilling his love for football, his grandfather influenced traits such as coaching/mentoring, hard-work, a special attention to detail, planning, ethics, and love for learning. These attributes have been the hallmarks of Professor Cushman's character.

== The Castagnoli-Cushman reaction ==
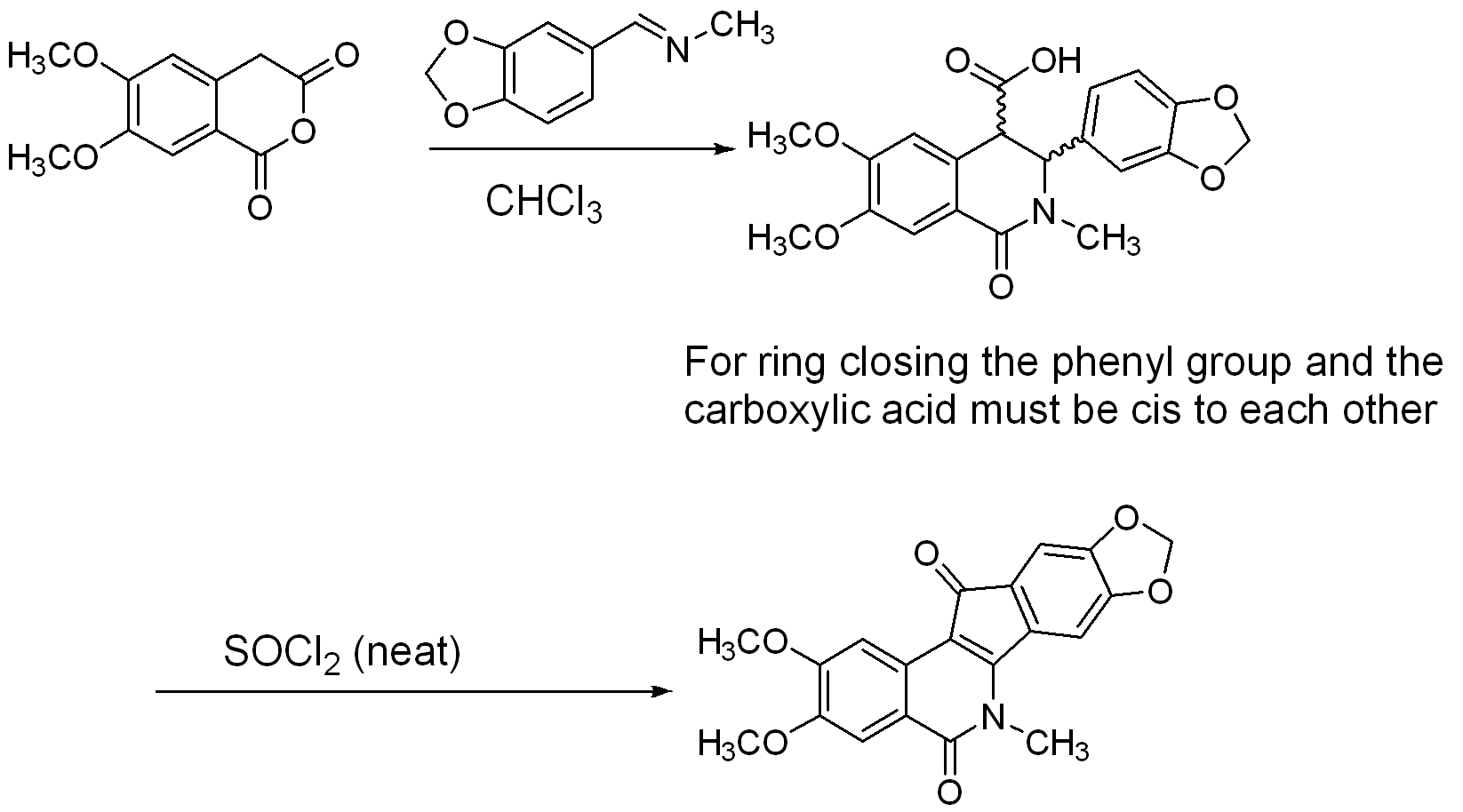
Synthesis of an indenoisoquinoline using the Castagnoli-Cushman reaction

In the 1970's, while working in the group of Neal Castagnoli, Jr., Ph.D., he reported and studied in detail the condensation of cyclic anhydrides with imines (work that was based on a previous report by Castagnoli). This reaction is currently known as the Castagnoli-Cushman reaction. One of its first applications was for the preparation of nitrogen analogues of tetrahydrocannabinol, a pharmacologically active natural product isolated from Cannabis sativa. This versatile transformation has been used to generate polysubstituted lactam carboxylic acids and to prepare benzophenanthridine and protoberberine alkaloids, and hundreds of indenoisoquinolines. A general scheme of the Cushman-Castagnoli reaction, applied to the synthesis of a model indenoisoquinoline, is shown to the right. Later, the conditions were optimized and include the formation of an acyl chloride followed by condensation using AlCl_{3}.

== Development of the indenoisoquinolines ==
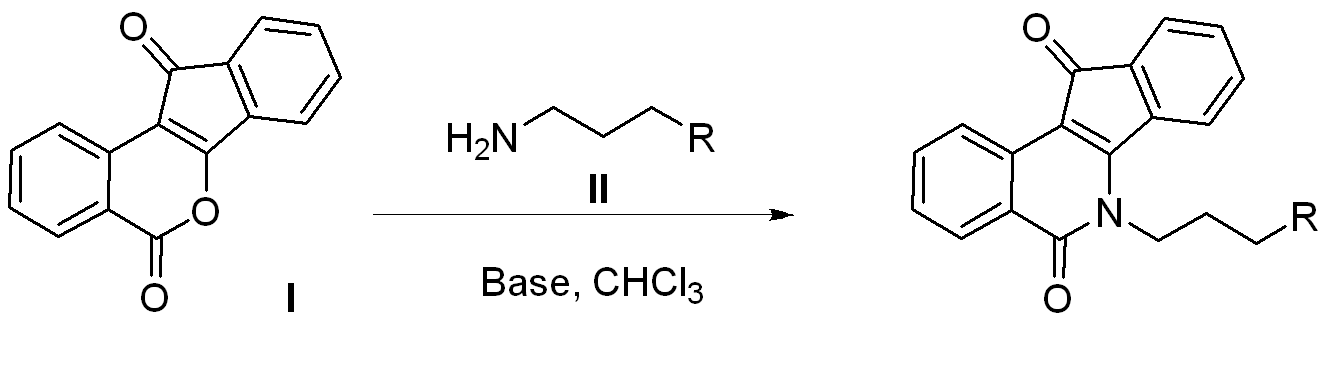
An alternative synthetic method for the preparation of an indenoisoquinoline

Dr. Cushman is the world leader in the design and synthesis of the indenoisoquinolines. These drugs, which were discovered serendipitously during a synthesis of the antileukemic agent nitidine chloride, can eradicate cancer cells. The seminal paper describing the synthesis of the molecules, using the Castagnoli-Cushman Reaction, was published in The Journal of Organic Chemistry. Alternatively, the indenoisoquinolines can be prepared by reacting a benz[d]indeno[1,2-b]pyran-5,11-dione (I) with an amine (II).

Initially, it was discovered the indenoisoquinolines inhibited the action of the topoisomerase I enzyme. Later, it was found these molecules can also affect other targets including the retinoid X receptor (RXR), poly [ADP-ribose] polymerase 1 (PARP-1), topoisomerase II, estrogen receptor, vascular endothelial growth factor-2 (VEGFR-2), hypoxia-inducible factor 1-alpha (HIF-1a), tyrosyl DNA phosphodiesterases (TDP) 1 and 2, and G-quadruplexes.

In addition, the Cushman group and collaborators have reported that indenoisoquinolines could potentially treat other diseases including visceral Leishmaniasis, African trypanosomiasis (sleeping sickness), and Angelman syndrome.

== Total synthesis ==
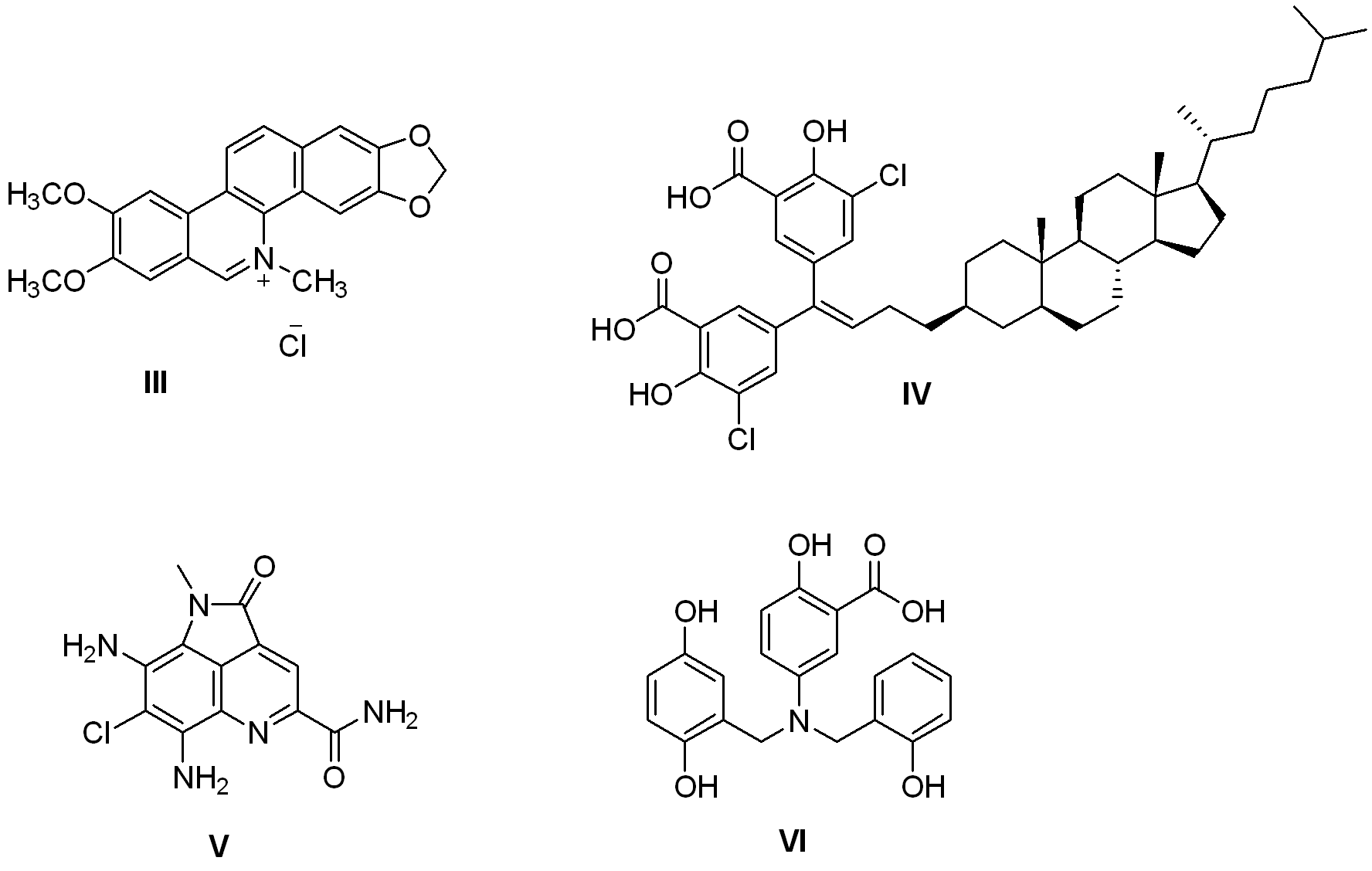
Selected natural products synthesized by Mark Cushman and co-workers

Another main contribution of Mark Cushman and his group deals with the synthesis of various natural products and pharmacologically active synthetic substances. Some of the compounds his group prepared include: the antileukemic agent nitidine chloride (III); corydaline, which possesses antinociceptive and antiallergic activities among others; thalictricavine, an inhibitor of human acetylcholinesterase and butyrylcholinesteras; berlambine; (±)-canadine; (+)-thalictrifoline; cosalane (IV), a molecule that inhibits HIV by acting on various targets; (±) chelidonine, a non-specific cholinesterase inhibitor; ammosamide B (V), a cytotoxic natural product that targets myosin; lavendustin A (VI), a tyrosine kinase inhibitor; and (+)- and (–)-corynoline.

== Awards and honors ==
Professor Cushman has received various awards including:

- Election into the Division of Medicinal Chemistry Hall of Fame class of 2026 (2026)
- Purdue University Chapter of Sigma Xi Research Award in Science and Engineering (2019)
- The Philip S. Portoghese Joint Lectureship sponsored by the Journal of Medicinal Chemistry and the ACS Division of Medicinal Chemistry (2018)
- The Ole Gisvold Lectureship in Medicinal Chemistry from the Department of Medicinal Chemistry at the University of Minnesota (2018)
- Fellow of the National Academy of Inventors (2018)
- Highly Prolific Author by the Journal of Medicinal Chemistry (2017)
- Purdue Innovators Hall of Fame Inductee (2016)
- The University of California San Francisco 150th Anniversary Alumni Excellence Award (2015)
- The Webster-Sibilsky Lecturer, University of Illinois (2012)
- Fellow of the American Association for the Advancement of Science (2012)
- Chaney Scholar Award for Exceptional Research (2012)
- Purdue Cancer Research Award (2004)
- National Institutes of Health Postdoctoral Fellowship (1973–1975)
- Senior Fulbright Scholar (1983–1984)

== Others ==
Dr. Cushman served on the Editorial Advisory Board of The Journal of Organic Chemistry (1999–2004). He also served on the Editorial Advisory Board (2005–2010) and as Associate Editor (2012–2020) of The Journal of Medicinal Chemistry. He is a member of the Board of Directors of Gibson Oncology.
