= Joseph P. Remington =

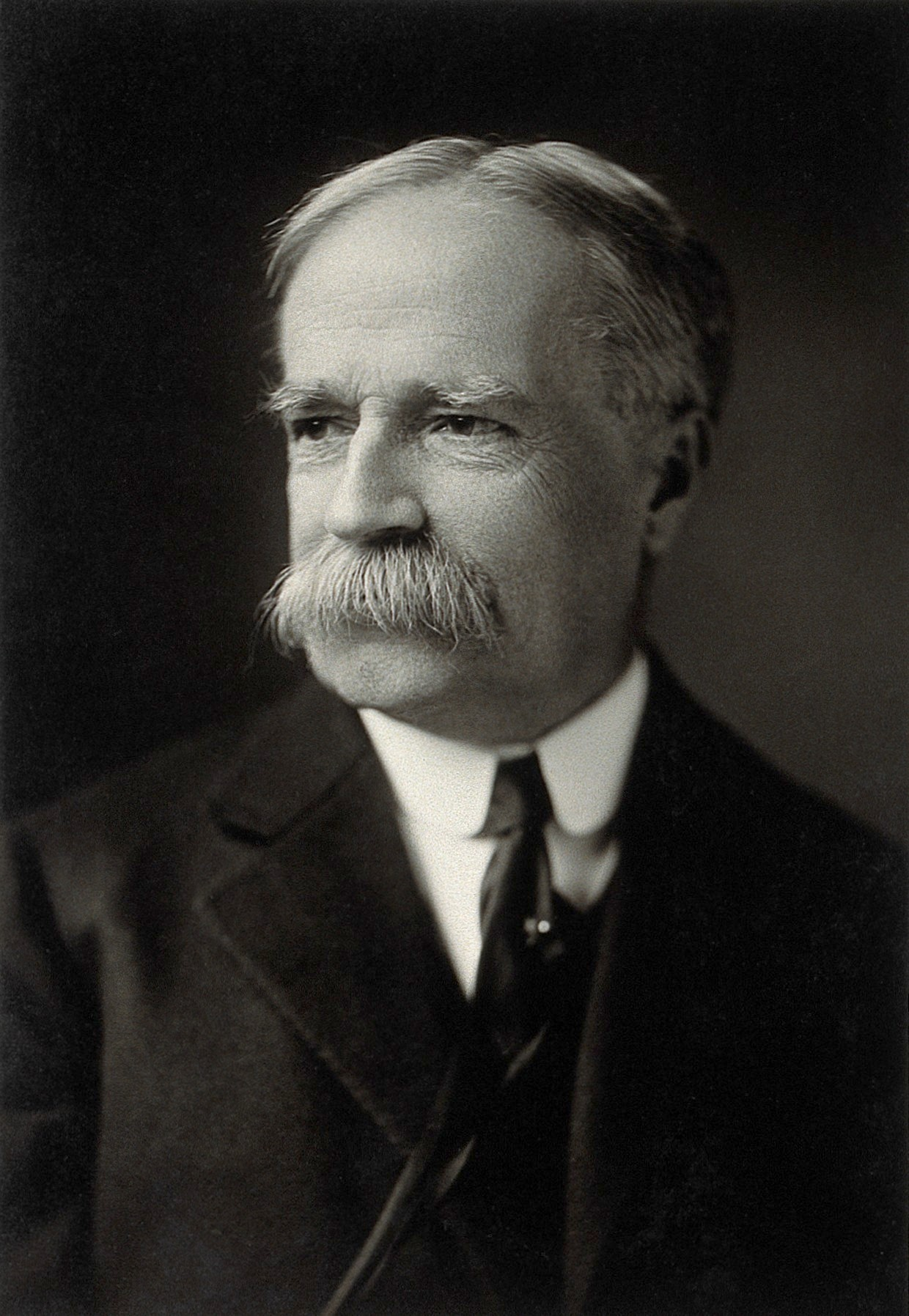
- Portrait of Joseph P. Remington.
- Born: March 26, 1847; Philadelphia, Pennsylvania
- Died: January 1, 1918 (aged 70)
- Occupation: Pharmacist

Joseph P. Remington (March 26, 1847 – January 1, 1918) was a community pharmacist, manufacturer, and educator. An active participant and a supporter of the International Pharmaceutical Congress, Remington served as president of the 7th Congress in Chicago in 1893.

== Awards and honors ==
Remington was elected to the American Philosophical Society in 1899.

The Remington Medal was established in 1918 and awarded by the American Pharmacists Association. The award is considered the most prestigious award given in the profession of pharmacy in the United States.

== See also ==
- List of pharmacists
