= Daniel B. Smith =

Daniel Burlington Smith
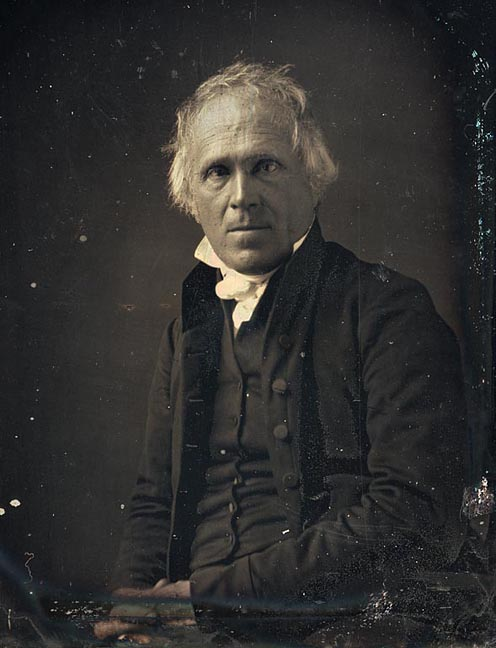
- Born: July 14, 1792; Philadelphia, Pennsylvania
- Died: March, 1883; Germantown, Philadelphia, Pennsylvania
- Occupation(s): educator, pharmacist, author
- Spouse(s): Esther Morton, daughter of John Morton, Philadelphia Banker

Daniel B. Smith (July 14, 1792 – March, 1883) was an educator, pharmacist, and taxidermist in Philadelphia, Pennsylvania.

== Biography ==
Smith was educated at the Burlington Friends School under John Griscom, where he acquired an interest in scientific studies. In January 1811, he dissected and mounted a Bald Eagle (Haliaeetus leucocephalus) that was collected by Alexander Wilson (1766–1813) near Egg Harbor Township, New Jersey, which became the model for Wilson's drawing, which was engraved by Alexander Lawson (1773–1846) for Pl. 36 of American Ornithology, vol. 4 (1811). Wilson also quoted at length from Smith's dissection notes, and his original sketch of Smith's taxidermy is preserved in the archives of the Ernst Mayr Library, Museum of Comparative Zoology, Harvard University.

On graduating, he apprenticed to John Biddle in the apothecary business, and on completion he was admitted to partnership. In 1819 he opened a drug store in downtown Philadelphia, and in 1828 he entered into partnership with William Hodgson, renaming the firm "Smith & Hodgson", and continued to be active in business until a few years before his death. At the age of 28, he was one of the founders of the Apprentices' Library of Philadelphia.

Smith was a prominent member of a group of pharmacists that in 1821 established the Philadelphia College of Pharmacy (now the University of the Sciences in Philadelphia) the first college of pharmacy in the country, was elected vice president in 1828, and from 1829 to 1854 served as president. In 1852, he became the first president of the American Pharmaceutical Association.

In 1824, Smith married Esther Morton, daughter of John Morton, a prominent Philadelphia merchant and banker, and his second wife, Mary Robinson of Newport, RI. They had sons John and Benjamin, and one daughter, Mary.

Daniel B Smith and wife Esther Morton Smith.

Smith was chairman of the committee that in 1826 published the first issue of the "American Journal of Pharmacy." He was acclaimed for his wide knowledge of the natural sciences and liberal arts, and in 1834 became Professor of Moral Philosophy, English Literature, and Chemistry in Haverford School (now Haverford College), and served as Superintendent (Principal) from 1843 to 1846.

With his background in moral teaching he was prominent in starting the House of Refuge for Juvenile Delinquents in 1828. He was an important organizer of the American Pharmaceutical Association in 1852, and convened its first meeting in Philadelphia, where he was elected the APhA's first president.

Smith was an original member of the Franklin Institute, and also of the Pennsylvania Historical Society from its organization in 1825, and was its first corresponding secretary. Throughout his life he was active in the Society of Friends (Quakers) and served a term as clerk (convenor) of the Philadelphia Quarterly Meeting. He was also a member of the American Philosophical Society and of the Academy of Natural Sciences in Philadelphia.

He was an original incorporator of the "Old Philadelphia Saving Fund". He published "The Principles of Chemistry" (Philadelphia, 1837,1842). Daniel Smith's son Benjamin R. Smith married Esther Fisher Wharton, the sister of Joseph Wharton. The American Pharmacists Association continues a yearly award in the name of Daniel B. Smith for excellence in the practice of Pharmacy.
