= University of the Sciences =

Private university in Philadelphia, Pennsylvania, US (1821–2022)

Coordinates: 39.9461°N 75.2075°W

- Motto: Nosse haec omnia salus est
- Motto in English: To know all this is health
- Type: Private university
- Active: 1821–June 1, 2022
- Location: Philadelphia, Pennsylvania, U.S.
- Campus: Urban
- Athletics: 12 varsity teams, 17 intramural clubs
- Colors: Maroon and slate
- Nickname: Devils
- Sporting affiliations: NCAA Division II – CACC, ECAC
- Mascot: Drake the Devil
- Website: www.usciences.edu
- (Merged with St. Joseph's University 2022)

University of the Sciences in Philadelphia (University of the Sciences or USciences), previously Philadelphia College of Pharmacy and Science (PCPS), was a private university in Philadelphia, Pennsylvania, United States. On June 1, 2022, it officially merged into Saint Joseph's University.

== History ==
=== 19th century ===
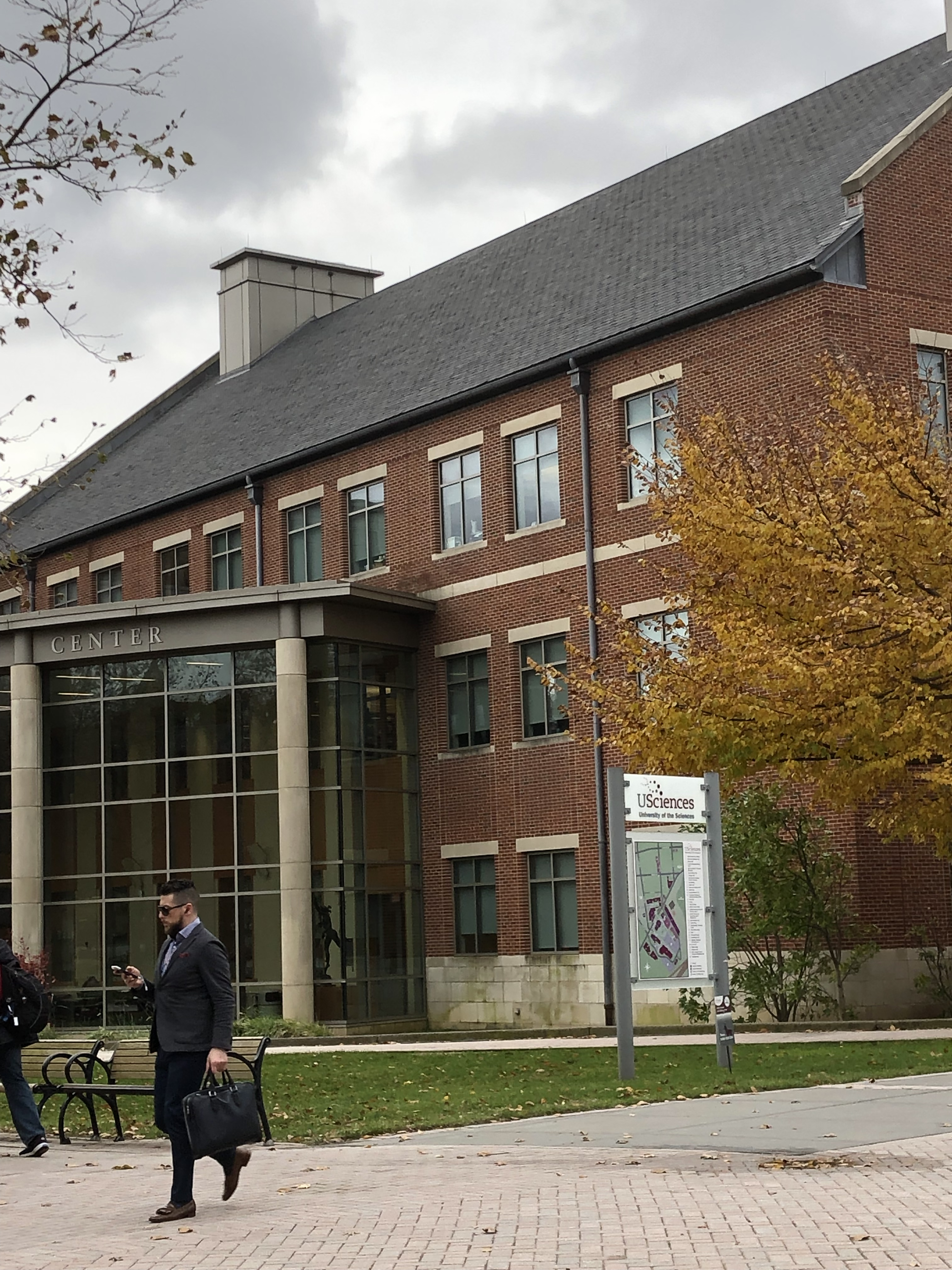
The campus entrance

University of the Sciences traced its history to February 1821, when 68 apothecaries met in Philadelphia's Carpenters' Hall to establish improved scientific standards and to develop programs to train more competent apprentices and students. They formalized their new association through a constitution, which declared their intent to establish a school of pharmacy to enhance their vocation and to "guard the drug market from the introduction of spurious, adulterated, deteriorated or otherwise mischievous articles, which are too frequently forced into it". Classes began nearly immediately, making Philadelphia College of Pharmacy (PCP) the first institution of higher learning in the United States dedicated to the field of pharmacy.

In 1825, PCP began publishing the first academic journal in the United States dedicated to pharmacy. For the period 1825–1834, the periodical was issued under the title Journal of the Philadelphia College of Pharmacy. After 1834, the journal continued to be published by PCP, but under the revised title American Journal of Pharmacy.

Although matriculation was originally limited to men, the college became coeducational in 1876, when Dr. Clara Marshall, later dean of the Woman's Medical College of Pennsylvania, began attending lectures there. In 1883, Dr. Susan Hayhurst was conferred a degree in pharmacy, thus becoming the college's first female graduate, and the first woman in the United States to be granted a degree in pharmacy. In 1889, Dr. Hayhurst applied for and received a license to operate a retail drug business. By 1898, she was serving as the director of the pharmaceutical department of the Women's Hospital of Philadelphia. Reports at the time noted she was credited with being "the first regularly graduated woman pharmacist in the world who took up the business in a practical way after graduation."

=== 20th century ===
In 1916, PCP substantially expanded its student enrollment and scope via a merger with another prominent Philadelphia pharmacy school. In April of that year, a series of letters among principals associated with three well-known Philadelphia medical schools—the University of Pennsylvania, Jefferson Medical College, and the Medico-Chirurgical College of Philadelphia indicated they were discussing a merger. By June 1916, an agreement had been reached to consolidate those schools under common management.

The Medico-Chirurgical College's assets included its schools of medicine, dentistry, and pharmacy, and upon completion of the merger, PCP and Penn began discussions about Penn's newly acquired department of pharmacy. After some negotiation, Penn agreed to divest, and PCP agreed to absorb, Medico-Chirurgical College's School of Pharmacy. The merger combined the student bodies of both schools under the auspices of PCP. All of PCP's board of directors, administrators, and teachers were retained, and the former dean of the Medico-Chirurgical Pharmacy School was added to the PCP staff as associate dean. PCP's president at the time, Howard B. French, noted in his statement of August 19, 1916, announcing the consolidation, that “…after careful consideration, it was decided that it would be better, in the interest of and for promoting higher pharmaceutical education in the city of Philadelphia, that the Medico-Chirurgical department of pharmacy should be consolidated with Philadelphia College of Pharmacy, the oldest and largest institution of its kind in the United States.”

While PCP initially emphasized the biological and chemical sciences as mainstays of the pharmacy curriculum, it later instituted separate curricula in three other areas: bacteriology, biology, and chemistry. In 1920, to reflect its broader scope, the institution changed its name to Philadelphia College of Pharmacy and Science, with state authorization to grant not only the baccalaureate degree but also the master's and doctorate in all four disciplines.

Over the next 75 years, the college evolved and expanded, adding courses to its core curriculum, as well as courses to enhance the role of the humanities and social sciences in its science-based curricula. Primarily a commuter campus in its early days, the institution gradually transformed into one in which residential life and extracurricular activities played increasing roles in student development.

In February 1997, the Commonwealth of Pennsylvania approved the institution's application for university status. The following year the institution officially changed its name to the University of the Sciences in Philadelphia (USP), to reflect its broad spectrum of new health and science programs.

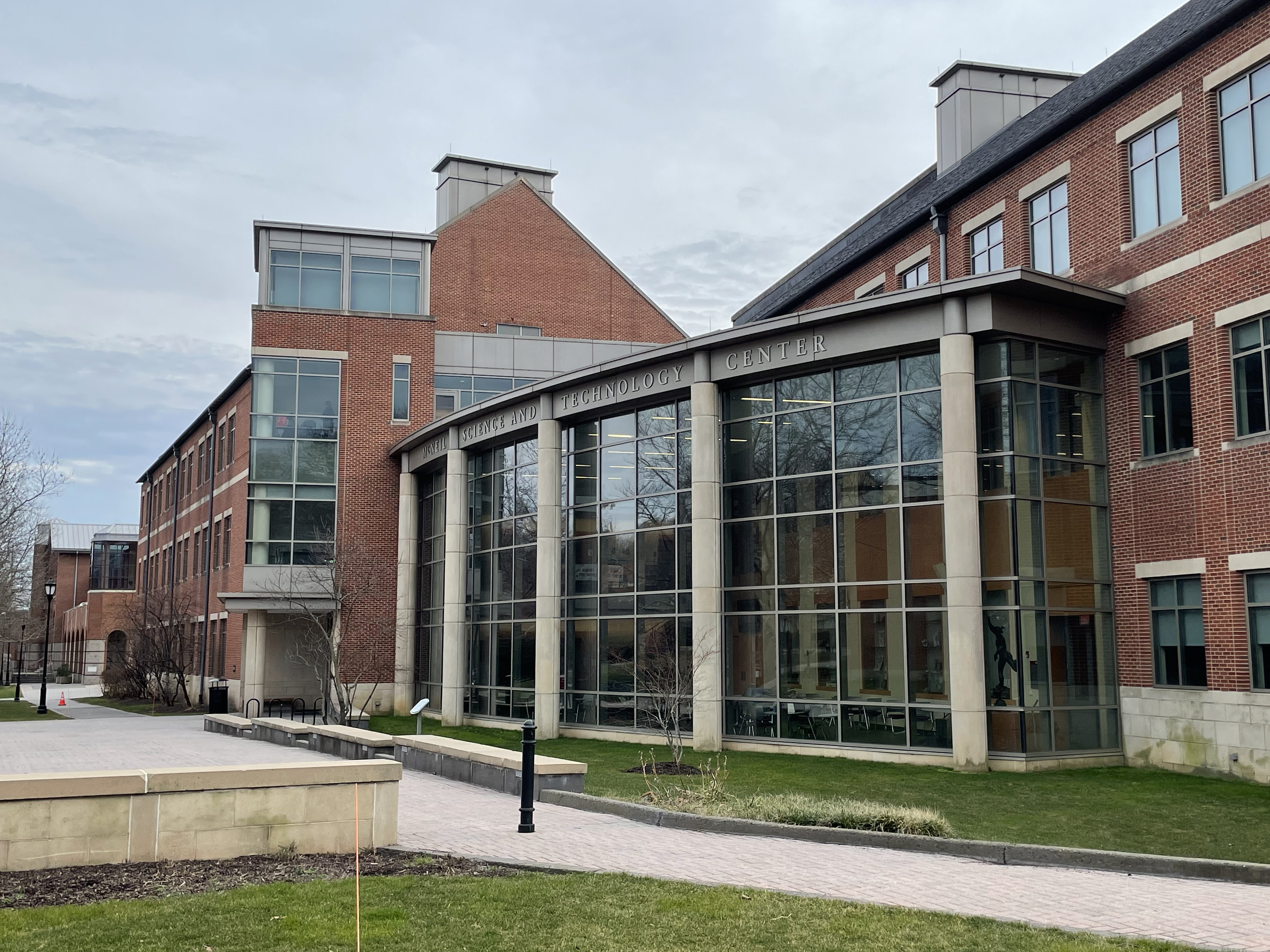
McNeil Science And Technology Center

The same year, USP doubled the size of its campus when it acquired an adjacent, vacant industrial site—the home of the original Breyers Ice Cream factory, which closed its Philadelphia operation in the early 1990s.

=== 21st century ===
The additional space allowed the university to add a 1,000-seat event gymnasium, recreation gymnasium, natatorium, fitness areas, a 1/10 mile indoor track, and a new three-story, 78,000 sq. ft. academic building, the McNeil Science and Technology Center, which was a mixed-use facility housing classrooms, lecture halls, and teaching and research laboratories, was officially dedicated in September 2006. Named after alumnus Robert L. McNeil Jr., former chairman and CEO of McNeil Laboratories (now part of Johnson & Johnson), it serves as home to the school's computer science, physics, biological sciences, and bioinformatics departments.

In 2010, the university adjusted its name by dropping "in Philadelphia" from common usage (though the phrase remains a part of its registered name). According to the institution's president at the time, Philip P. Gerbino, "This shorter convention helps on the web, when we communicate to our students, and when we communicate to our prospective students and their families."

In addition to referencing itself simply as University of the Sciences, the university also replaced the acronym, "USP", with the abbreviation, "USciences". Not only was this a more descriptive name, but it also helped eliminate ambiguity between the school and a primary standards organization in the pharmaceutical field, United States Pharmacopeia, well known for its USP label.

Four years later, in 2014, the institution added to its campus another new 3-story building, known as the Integrated Professional Education Complex (IPEX). Housing clinical spaces, exam rooms, and simulation labs in a 57,000 sq. ft. space, the IPEX gives students from a variety of disciplines the opportunity to learn in a hands-on environment as well as in the classroom. In 2019, the university opened the Living & Learning Commons, a mixed-use residence hall with classroom, retail, living, and learning spaces.

In 2017 the university launched a marketing campaign after experiencing five years of declining enrollment. The following year the incoming freshman class increased but not enough to offset a $4.5 million budget deficit. Some programs were phased out, staff positions eliminated, and athletic programs re-evaluated. In December 2020 the university's credit rating was downgraded due to "unstainable" withdrawals from its endowment funds to pay debt obligations.

In 2020, the University of the Sciences launched USciences Online, a division of the university dedicated to providing degree and certificate programs through fully online learning.

In 2021, the University of the Sciences signed a formal Letter of Intent to begin exploratory merger conversations with Saint Joseph's University. On June 9, 2021, the universities announced formal merger proceedings. In March 2022 the merger was approved by the Middle States Commission on Higher Education. The merger became effective on June 1, and as of December 31 USciences ceased to have degree granting authority.

In November 2022, St. Joe’s announced plans to transfer undergraduate programs and students from the former USciences’ campus in University City to St. Joe’s main Hawk Hill campus. Several hundred students, primarily graduate students and those starting their professional studies, continued to attend the former USciences campus, which was put up for sale as of January 2025.

=== Historic contributions ===
First created in 1820, the United States Pharmacopeia (USP) established, and has delineated since that date, the standards for manufacturing drugs across America. For the first decade, it was written by medical practitioners. However, according to the Journal of the American Pharmaceutical Association, "at the 1830 [U.S. Pharmacopeial] convention, the Philadelphia College of Pharmacy presented for consideration 'a complete revised copy of the Pharmacopeia elaborated with ability and great industry, and the Committee accepted, after deliberate examination, nearly all of the suggestions' (U.S.P. IX, X); and thus was paved the way for the representation of pharmacists in all subsequent revisions." PCP faculty members were instrumental in its continued development and served as editors for more than a hundred years.

Later, PCP professors Franklin Bache and George B. Wood compiled a comprehensive commentary on drugs, The Dispensatory of the United States of America, which was first published in 1833. Like the Pharmacopeia, the Dispensatory was authored and edited for more than a hundred years by successive generations of faculty at the college.

William Procter Jr., often described as "the father of American pharmacy", was a PCP professor from 1846 to 1874, as well as serving as an officer of the board. He and Daniel B. Smith were instrumental in the founding of the American Pharmaceutical Association, the national professional society of pharmacists. Founded and organized in Philadelphia on October 6, 1852, it is now called the American Pharmacists Association (APhA)—the first-established and largest professional association of pharmacists in the United States. The more than 60,000 current members of APhA include practicing pharmacists, pharmaceutical scientists, pharmacy students, pharmacy technicians and others interested in advancing the profession.

In 1868, John M. Maisch, PCP professor (1866–1893) and dean (1879–1893), proposed the creation of a Pharmaceutical Board to be appointed by the governor of each state. He also established the term "registered pharmacist" to identify those who satisfied each Board's requirements. Soon after, Maisch began to share his proposal with each governor, and, by 1878, nine states had adopted pharmacy laws that licensed pharmacists. The trend continued, and every state now has a Board of Pharmacy which regulates the practice of pharmacy.

In 1885, PCP professor Joseph P. Remington published The Practice of Pharmacy, which soon became established as the standard text in the field. Later renamed Remington: The Science and Practice of Pharmacy, this comprehensive reference work remains widely used throughout the world. The 23rd edition was published in October 2020 jointly by Academic Press and University of the Sciences.

== Academics ==
=== Colleges ===
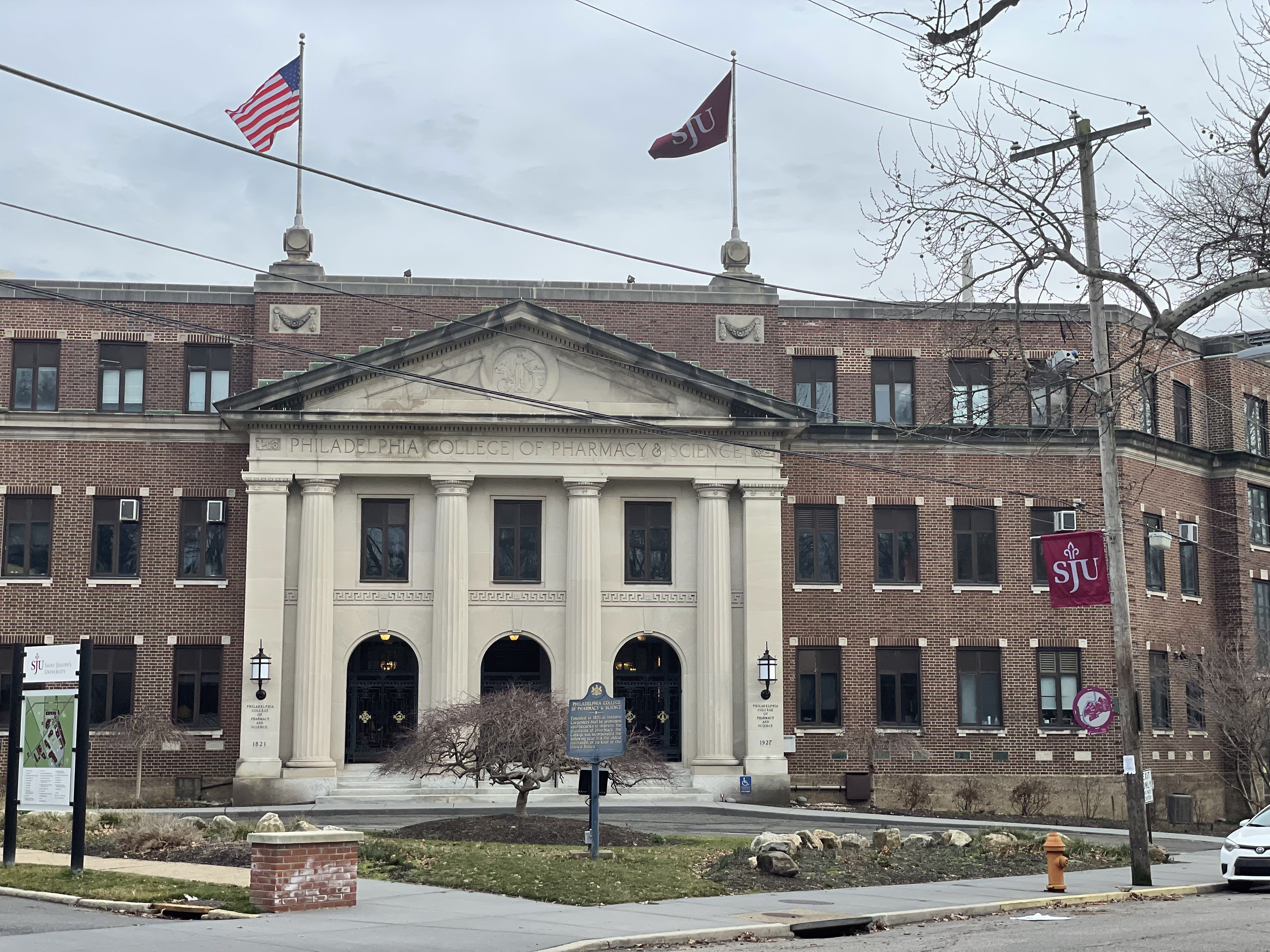
Philadelphia College Of Pharmacy & Science Griffith Hall building.

The university operated four colleges that offered more than 30 certificate- and degree-granting programs:

- Philadelphia College of Pharmacy offered courses in Pharmaceutical Sciences, Pharmaceutical and Healthcare Business, and Pharmacy Practice and Administration. The Philadelphia College of Pharmacy was the nation's first school of pharmacy.
- Samson College of Health Sciences focused its coursework on Kinesiology, Occupational Therapy, Physical Therapy, and Physician Assistant Studies.
- Misher College of Arts and Sciences provided programs for Behavioral and Social Sciences, Biological Sciences, Chemistry and Biochemistry, Humanities, and Math, Physics and Statistics.
- Mayes College of Healthcare Business and Policy offered advanced degrees related to the business of health policy and public health. It was dissolved in 2018 and incorporated into the Philadelphia College of Pharmacy.

=== Accreditation and approved credential levels ===
From 1962, University of the Sciences had been continuously accredited by the Middle States Commission on Higher Education (MSCHE), with the following credential levels currently included in its accreditation scope:

- Postsecondary award (< 1 year)
- Bachelor's Degree or Equivalent
- Post-baccalaureate Certificate
- Master's Degree or Equivalent
- Doctor's Degree - Professional Practice
- Doctor's Degree- Research/Scholarship

In addition, a number of individual programs within USciences were offered under the auspices of specialized accrediting bodies in appropriate disciplines.

== Campus ==
The USciences campus covers approximately 24 acres of urban landscape in the section of West Philadelphia known as University City, which also encompasses the University of Pennsylvania and Drexel University. It is bordered on one side by Clark Park and on another by The Woodlands, an historic cemetery that now serves as a large urban park with walking and bicycle trails. The campus comprises 23 buildings, including academic halls, laboratories, mixed-use and dedicated residence halls, as well as open spaces and athletic venues. The oldest building, Griffith Hall, was added to the Philadelphia Register of Historic Places in May 2024.

In September 2022, the interim president of St. Joseph's informed the university community that all former USciences undergraduate programs would be transitioned to the main Hawk Hill campus. Graduate health sciences programs would be consolidated into the southwest section of the University City campus. However in February 2024 St. Joesph's announced their intention to sell the entire University City campus. After having failed to find a single buyer for the entire campus, twelve individual properties were for sale as of January 2025. In September 2025 fifteen former Usciences buildings were sold to a charter school system for an undiscolosed amount.

=== Marvin Samson Center for the History of Pharmacy ===
The Marvin Samson Center for the History of Pharmacy, located in Griffith Hall, houses artifacts, objects and records associated with pharmacology, pharmaceutical manufacturing and the practice of pharmacy, as well as the history of USciences. Its permanent collection ranges from ceramic and glass apothecary jars, mortars and pestles, and tools and instruments for drug preparation, to pharmacy and drug advertising items, nursing and orthopedic equipment and paintings and sculpture. The Samson Center has also become home to Wyeth Pharmaceuticals's artifacts and archives.

=== The J. W. England Library ===
The library of the University of the Sciences in Philadelphia was formed in 1821 at the second meeting of the board of trustees and collected significant works in pharmaceutical science from its inception. In 1973, the library moved into a free-standing building and was named the Joseph W. England Library. Small but specialized, the collection is particularly strong in pharmacy, pharmacognosy, pharmaceutics and foreign drug compendia. Other areas of specialization include toxicology, pharmacology and physical therapy. In total, the library housed more than 470,000 volumes, with an annual circulation of approximately 5,680.

The library was also a member of the Network of the National Library of Medicine (NNLM), which is administered under the U.S. National Institutes of Health (NIH). Among its collection were the holdings of the Leopold Helfand Rare Book and Archives Room, which include seventeenth and eighteenth-century botanicals, books once belonging to Benjamin Franklin and Sir Isaac Newton, as well as the theses of Dr. Eli Lilly, Sir Henry S. Wellcome and Silas M. Burroughs, written in their own hand. Since the university and its graduates were of interest to anyone researching the origins of the pharmaceutical industry. As of January 2024 the library had closed. The library building was among those included in the 2025 campus sale.

== Notable alumni ==
Graduates of University of the Sciences include the first woman conferred a pharmacy degree in the U.S., as well as founders of, or executives at, what would become six of the world's leading pharmaceutical companies:

- Frederick Gutekunst (Class of 1853) – photographer
- John Wyeth (Class of 1854) – founder of John Wyeth and Brother, which became Wyeth LLC, now a part of Pfizer.
- William R. Warner (Class of 1856) – founded a drugstore in Philadelphia the same year he graduated that became Warner Pharmaceuticals when he invented a tablet coating process. His company merged with Lambert Pharmaceuticals in 1955 to form Warner-Lambert, now a part of Pfizer.
- Sir Henry Wellcome (Class of 1874) – co-founder of Burroughs Wellcome and Company in England, which is now part of GlaxoSmithKline.
- Silas M. Burroughs (Class of 1877) – co-founder of Burroughs Wellcome and Company, which is now part of GlaxoSmithKline.
- Josiah K. Lilly Sr. (Class of 1882) and his son, Eli Lilly (Class of 1907) – who served successively as president of Eli Lilly and Company, which was founded in 1876 by Colonel Eli Lilly, Josiah's father and the younger Eli's grandfather.
- Dr. Susan Hayhurst (Class of 1883) – longtime head of the pharmaceutical department at the Woman's Hospital of Philadelphia and the first woman to receive a pharmacy degree in the United States
- Gerald F. Rorer (Class of 1931) – president of William H. Rorer, Inc., which was founded by his father, the company's namesake. It is now part of Sanofi.
- Robert L. McNeil Jr. (Class of 1938) – chairman and CEO of McNeil Laboratories Inc., now part of Johnson & Johnson. A campus building named after him opened in 2006.

== Athletics ==
USciences' athletic teams were known as the Devils. The university was a member of the Division II level of the National Collegiate Athletic Association (NCAA), primarily competing in the Central Atlantic Collegiate Conference (CACC) from 1999–2000 until their final season in the 2021–22 academic year. Following their merger with Saint Joseph's University, USciences' teams would since merge with the Division I Saint Joseph's Hawks team programs.

USciences competed in 12 intercollegiate varsity sports: Men's sports included baseball, basketball, cross country, golf, tennis, and track & field; while women's sports included basketball, cross country, softball, tennis, track & field, and volleyball.

The baseball team participated in the Bill Giles Invitational tournament for Division II teams in the Philadelphia area. In 2019, the Devils made it to the championship, losing to the Wilmington University Wildcats by a score of 7–3.
