= Annals of Pharmacotherapy =

- Discipline: Pharmacology
- Language: English
- Edited by: Milap C. Nahata, Eugene M. Sorkin

Publication details
- Former names: Drug Intelligence, Drug Intelligence & Clinical Pharmacy, DICP: The Annals of Pharmacotherapy
- History: 1967-present
- Publisher: SAGE Publications
- Frequency: Monthly
- Open access: Hybrid
- Impact factor: 3.154 (2020)

Standard abbreviations
- ISO 4: Ann. Pharmacother.
- NLM: Ann Pharmacother

Indexing
- CODEN: APHRER
- ISSN: 1060-0280 (print); 1542-6270 (web)
- LCCN: 92648983
- OCLC no.: 24850495

Links
- Journal homepage; Online access; Online archive

The Annals of Pharmacotherapy is a monthly peer-reviewed medical journal covering all aspects of pharmacotherapy. It was established in 1967 as Drug Intelligence. The name changed a few times during its history, to Drug Intelligence & Clinical Pharmacy in 1969, and DICP: The Annals of Pharmacotherapy in 1989, before obtaining its current name in 1992. According to the Journal Citation Reports, the journal has a 2020 impact factor of 3.154.
