= American Journal of Health-System Pharmacy =

- Discipline: Pharmacy practice
- Language: English
- Edited by: Daniel J. Cobaugh

Publication details
- History: 1943–present
- Publisher: American Society of Health-System Pharmacists (United States)
- Frequency: Biweekly
- Impact factor: 1.882 (2014)

Standard abbreviations
- ISO 4: Am. J. Health-Syst. Pharm.

Indexing
- CODEN: AHSPEK
- ISSN: 1079-2082 (print); 1535-2900 (web)
- OCLC no.: 41233599

Links
- Journal homepage; Online access; Online archive

The American Journal of Health-System Pharmacy is a biweekly peer-reviewed medical journal covering all aspects of drug therapy and pharmacy practice specific to hospitals. It was established in 1943 and is published by the American Society of Health-System Pharmacists. The editor-in-chief is Daniel J. Cobaugh.

== History ==
The journal was founded in 1943 as the Bulletin of the American Society of Hospital Pharmacists. It was renamed the American Journal of Hospital Pharmacy in 1958. Its sponsoring society launched a second journal, Clinical Pharmacy, in 1982; the two publications merged in 1994. In 1995 the AJHS obtained its present title.

== Abstracting and indexing ==
The journal is abstracted and indexed in:

- Chemical Abstracts Service
- CINAHL
- Current Contents/Clinical Medicine
- Current Contents/Life Sciences
- Index Medicus/MEDLINE/PubMed
- Science Citation Index
- Scopus

According to the Journal Citation Reports, the journal has a 2014 impact factor of 1.882.
