= Consultant pharmacist =

Provider of expert pharmaceutical advice

A consultant pharmacist is a pharmacist who works as a consultant providing expert advice on clinical pharmacy, academic pharmacy or practice, public health pharmacy, industrial pharmacy, community pharmacy or practice, pharmaceutical analysis etc., regarding the safe use and production of medications or on the provision of pharmaceutical services to medical institutions, hospitals, universities, research institutions, medical practices and individual patients.

== Australia ==
In Australia, a consultant pharmacist has historically referred to a pharmacist accredited to access funding to be remunerated for providing Residential Medication Management Reviews and Home Medication Reviews.

These pharmacists undergo a credentialing process, that was historically referred to as accreditation, and were then able to access the funding to perform these roles. The major accreditation organisation, known as the Australian Association of Consultant Pharmacy, was disbanded in 2022. The Pharmaceutical Society of Australia, Society of Hospital Pharmacists Australia and the Australian College of Pharmacy (owned by the Queensland branch of the Pharmacy Guild of Australia) were temporarily the three organisations that provide credentialing for pharmacists to be able to undertake domiciliary medication management reviews between 2022 and 2024.

The Australian Pharmacy Council has developed Aged Care Accreditation Standards in 2023 for pharmacists working in residential aged care settings and undertaking medication management reviews. These standards are being developed in response to a series of research papers published by the Consultant Pharmacists' Services Research Network (COHERENT) that has found inconsistencies in the delivery of these services and the preparedness of pharmacists generally to move into these settings.

The Australian Pharmacy Council now accredits courses that lead to initial accreditation.

== United States ==
In the US, a consultant pharmacist focuses on reviewing and managing the medication regimens of patients, particularly those in institutional settings such as nursing homes. Consultant pharmacists ensure their patients' medications are appropriate, effective, as safe as possible and used correctly; and identify, resolve, and prevent medication-related problems that may interfere with the goals of therapy.

The demand for consultant pharmacists is on the rise. Licensing and accrediting agencies such as Centers for Medicare and Medicaid (CMS), Accreditation Association for Ambulatory Health Care (AAAHC), The Joint Commission (JC) and individual states licensing bodies encourage healthcare facilities to use consultant pharmacists.

Consultants may specialize in one of the following areas: Regulatory, Quality, Technical, or Clinical.

== United Kingdom ==
In the UK's NHS, the term consultant pharmacist refers to a pharmacist who has advanced roles in patient care, research and education in a specific medical speciality or expert area of practice.

The Department of Health for England produced guidance in 2005 which described the role of the Consultant Pharmacist which is distinct from other roles in England and internationally. The posts are intended to be innovative new posts that will help improve patient care by retaining clinical excellence within the NHS and strengthening professional leadership. The consultant pharmacist posts have been created to provide a dynamic link between clinical practice and service development to support new models for delivering patient care. The title consultant pharmacist should only apply to approved posts that meet the principles, set out in the guidance, around four main functions:

- Expert practice, ensuring that the highest level of pharmaceutical expertise is available to those patients who need it and making the best use of high level pharmacy skills in patient care.
- Research, evaluation and service development, playing a crucial role in addressing the need to increase research capacity and to develop a workforce that is research aware as well as contributing to audit and service evaluation.
- Education, mentoring and overview of practice, with a clear role in working with higher education institutions (HEIs), undertaking teaching in their field of practice and work to enhance links between practice, professional bodies and HEIs.
- Professional leadership. Consultant pharmacists will develop and identify best practice working with advanced practitioners, professional managers of pharmaceutical services, and other relevant healthcare professionals to achieve successful outcomes. They will be acknowledged sources of expertise, and will contribute to the development of service strategies, which will drive change across health and social care.

The guidance recommends that the title consultant pharmacist is not conferred on individuals purely in recognition of innovative or excellent practice, but for those practitioners who meet the required competencies for the post. In the NHS, the posts created within or across NHS organisations, are approved by Strategic Health Authorities (or clusters of SHA's). The SHA's provide approval panels for ratification of consultants posts to ensure that business plans match the spirit of this guidance and that posts are sustainable, equitable and transferable across the NHS.

The competency requirements for consultant pharmacists are drawn from the Advanced and Consultant Level Competency Framework designed by the Competency Development and Evaluation Group (CoDEG, see www.codeg.org) which is divided into six capability (competency) clusters. Postholders are required to demonstrate:

- A majority of competencies in each of the expert professional practice, building working relationships and leadership clusters at the highest level (mastery)

and

- A majority of the competencies in each of the management, education, training and development and research & evaluation clusters at the intermediate level (excellence).

There is work is underway to make explicit links between the Competency Framework and the NHS Knowledge and Skills Framework. The role of consultant pharmacists in the NHS is evolving and although many posts are currently based in hospital practice, the role is developing in primary care.

== See also ==
- Classification of Pharmaco-Therapeutic Referrals
- History of pharmacy
