= American Society of Health-System Pharmacists =

Professional organization of pharmacists

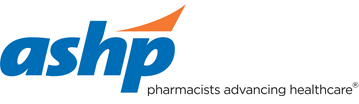
- Abbreviation: ASHP
- Formation: 1942
- Type: Professional association
- Headquarters: Bethesda, Maryland
- Region served: United States
- Fields: Pharmacy
- Members: 60,000 (2023)
- CEO: Paul W. Abramowitz, Pharm.D., Sc.D. (Hon.), FASHP
- President: Kim W. Benner
- Immediate Past President: Melanie A. Dodd
- Website: https://www.ashp.org/
- Formerly called: American Society of Hospital Pharmacists

The American Society of Health-System Pharmacists (ASHP) is a professional organization that represents pharmacists who serve as patient care providers in hospitals, health systems, ambulatory clinics, and other healthcare settings. The organization's nearly 60,000 members include pharmacists, student pharmacists, and pharmacy technicians. ASHP maintains a national database on U.S. drug shortages that is published on their website.

== Purpose ==
The aim of the society is to support the professional practice of pharmacists in hospitals and health systems. In addition, the society advocates to government agencies, such as the Food and Drug Administration (FDA) and the Centers for Disease Control and Prevention (CDC) on public policy issues related to medication use and public health.

== Publications ==
- ASHP Intersections
- AHFS Drug Information Book
- Handbook on Injectable Drugs
- American Journal of Health-System Pharmacy
- Best Practices for Hospital and Health-System Pharmacy
- Clinical Pharmacy (ISSN 0278-2677; published 1982–1993)
