= Hartmut Derendorf =

German-American pharmacist (1953–2020)

Hartmut Derendorf (August 6, 1953 – November 23, 2020) was a German-American pharmacist and clinical pharmacologist, a distinguished emeritus professor of pharmaceutics at University of Florida. A significant figure in his field, Derendorf published over 20 papers each with over 100 citations.

== Personal life and education ==
He was born on August 6, 1953, in Dortmund, Germany. He obtained his B.S. in 1976 and his PhD from University of Münster in 1979.

Derendorf died unexpectedly on November 23, 2020, while enjoying retirement in the United States.

== Awards ==
Derendorf served as president of ACCP (American College of Clinical Pharmacology) in 2006/08 and president of ISAP (International Society of Antiinfective Pharmacology) in 2004/06. He won the McKeen-Cattell Award for the best publication in J. Clin. Pharmacology (1994) and the Faculty Award of the University of Utrecht (2005). In 2003, he was awarded the Nathaniel T. Kwit Distinguished Service Award of ACCP and the Research Achievement Award in Clinical Science of the American Association of Pharmaceutical Sciences (AAPS). He was a Fellow of AAPS and ACCP as well as a former review panel member of the NASA Human Research Program. In 2010, he was awarded the Volwiler Award of the American Association of Colleges of Pharmacy (AACP) as well as the ACCP Distinguished Investigator Award, the highest research awards of both organizations. In 2013, he was awarded the First Leadership Award of the International Society of Pharmacometrics (ISOP). In 2015 he received the Merit Medal of the Westphalian Chamber of Pharmacy as well as the ACCP Mentorship Award. In 2018 he received the American Society for Clinical Pharmacology and Therapeutics (ASCPT) Mentor Award. He also served as the 18th University of Florida Distinguished Alumni Professor. Furthermore, he was awarded numerous teaching awards such as the UF Teaching Improvement Award, HHMI Distinguished Mentorship Award, UF Research Foundation Professorship, CVS Pharmacy Endowed Professorship, International Educator of the Year Award and UF Doctoral Advisor/Mentoring Award (2009 and 2018).

== Publications ==
Derendorf published over 470 scientific publications with an h-index (Scopus) of 56 and gave over 850 presentations at national or international meetings. He published ten textbooks in English and German. He was associate editor of The Journal of Clinical Pharmacology, International Journal of Clinical Pharmacology & Therapeutics, International Journal of Antimicrobial Agents and Die Pharmazie, and served on the editorial board of several other journals. His research interests included the pharmacokinetics and pharmacodynamics of corticosteroids, analgesics, antibiotics, as well as drug interactions.
