= Non-linear mixed-effects modeling software =

Special case of regression analysis

Nonlinear mixed-effects models are a special case of regression analysis for which a range of different software solutions are available. The statistical properties of nonlinear mixed-effects models make direct estimation by a BLUE estimator impossible. Nonlinear mixed effects models are therefore estimated according to Maximum Likelihood principles. Specific estimation methods are applied, such as linearization methods as first-order (FO), first-order conditional (FOCE) or the laplacian (LAPL), approximation methods such as iterative-two stage (ITS), importance sampling (IMP), stochastic approximation estimation (SAEM) or direct sampling. A special case is use of non-parametric approaches. Furthermore, estimation in limited or full Bayesian frameworks is performed using the Metropolis-Hastings or the NUTS algorithms. Some software solutions focus on a single estimation method, others cover a range of estimation methods and/or with interfaces for specific use cases.

== General-purpose software ==
General (use case agnostic) nonlinear mixed effects estimation software can be covering multiple estimation methods or focus on a single.

=== Software with multiple estimation methods ===
- SAS is a package that is used in the wide statistical community and supports multiple estimation methods from PROC NLMIX.
- Multiple estimation methods are available in the R open source software system, such as nlme.
- MATLAB provides multiple estimation methods in their nlmefit system.

SPSS at the moment does not support non-linear mixed effects methods.

=== Software dedicated to a single estimation method ===
- WinBUGS is an implementation of the Metropolis-Hastings method for Bayesian analysis.
- Stan is open source software that implements the NUTS algorithm.

== Software dedicated to pharmacometrics ==
The field of pharmacometrics relies heavily on nonlinear mixed effects approaches and therefore uses specialized software approaches. As with general-purpose software, implementations of both single or multiple estimation methods are available. This type of software relies heavily on ODE solvers.

=== Software with multiple estimation methods ===
- NONMEM is the most widely used software in the field of pharmacometics.
- Phoenix implements multiple estimation methods in a graphical user interface.
- Pumas implements multiple estimation methods in the julia language.
- nlmixr/nlmixr2 is a suite interfaced in R that implements FOCE and SAEM.
- ADAPT and S-ADAPT implement multiple estimation methods in a graphical or scripting interface, respectively.

=== Software dedicated to a single estimation method ===
- Monolix is a powerful implementation of SAEM which also can parse NMTRAN.
- NPEM implements non-parametric mixed effects.

=== Related software ===
- Efficiency of ODE solvers impacts quality of estimation. Popular solvers are Runge-Kutta based methods, various stiff solvers and switching solvers such as LSODA of the LAPACK suite.
- A specialized form of pharmacokinetics modeling, physiology-based pharmacokinetic (PBPK) modeling can in some cases also be seen as a nonlinear mixed-effects implementation, see also the software section of that lemma.
- Optimal design software such as PopED can be used in conjunction with estimation.
