= Roy Cook =

Roy Cook may refer to:

- Roy Cook (basketball) (fl. 1911–1912), American college basketball player
- Roy Bird Cook (1886–1961), pharmacist and historian in West Virginia

== See also ==
- Roy Cooke (born 1957), American professional poker player
