= SAAM II =

Compartmental and kinetic modeling software

SAAM II (software)
- Developer: Simone Perazzolo
- Release: v1.0 1993; 33 years ago
- Stable release: v2.3.3 2022; 3 years ago
- Operating system: Windows
- Type: Scientific
- License: Proprietary commercial software
- Website: www.nanomath.us

SAAM II (Simulation, Analysis, and Modeling, version 2.0) is a computer program used for compartmental modeling and systems analysis in the life sciences. It is widely cited in studies of pharmacokinetics and pharmacodynamics (PK/PD), tracer kinetics, dosimetry, and physiologically based pharmacokinetic (PBPK) modeling, as well as for the analysis of general systems described by ordinary differential equations (ODEs).

SAAM II provides a graphical "arrows and circles" interface that allows users to construct and simulate compartmental models visually. Its main features include multi-compartment fitting, the forcing function method that allows complex systems to be divided into simpler subsystems for independent analysis, and a Bayesian maximum a posteriori estimation that improves parameter fitting when data are noisy.

== Features ==
=== The compartmental module ===
SAAM II offers a user-friendly interface that eliminates the need for coding. Within the compartmental module, users can construct models effortlessly by drag-and-dropping various model components, such as circles, arrows, and boxes. To simulate the model's behavior, creating model conditions is a straightforward process. By employing drag-and-drop experiment-building icons, users can directly specify inputs and sampling sites with ease.

SAAM II snapshot

=== The non-compartmental module (numerical module) ===
The Numerical module is also available but less frequently used; it lets you write directly the equations of the model or model directly the data by predefined functions. The latter allows you to carry out a non-compartmental analysis of the data.

=== popKinetics add-on ===
Funded by NIH, popKinetics is specifically developed for population analysis of compartmental models built within SAAM II. popKinetics offers the computation of two approaches for population parameter estimation: the Standard Two-Stage and Iterative Two-Stage methods. The Two-Stage methods may be favored when simplicity, computational efficiency, and minimal assumptions are desired in analyzing the population.

=== Validation & Performance ===
The results obtained from SAAM II have received indirect validation through extensive usage over 25 years, replication of modeling in other programs, and publication in peer-reviewed journals. Validation of the software's numerical performance was carried out against WinNonlin. In general, there was good agreement (<1% difference) between SAAM II and WinNonlin in terms of parameter estimates and model predictions.

In a recent publication, fitting a large physiologically based pharmacokinetic (PBPK) model in SAAM II required approximately half the execution time compared with MATLAB, owing to the optimized algorithms implemented for compartmental analysis in SAAM II.

Recently SAAM II engine was used in extracting at scale the glucose-insulin minimal model indices from OGTTs - the automated Oral Minimal Model analysis (AOMM).

== Applications and Notable Work ==
1. Pharmacokinetics and Pharmacodynamics (PK/PD) Research:

- Optimization of drug dosing regimens for enhanced therapeutic outcomes.
- Modeling drug absorption, distribution, metabolism, and excretion in the body.
- Studying drug-drug interactions and predicting their effects.
- Indirect and custom PD.

2. Population Pharmacokinetics:

- Analyzing drug responses across diverse patient populations with Two-stage methods.
- Personalized medicine: Tailoring drug dosing based on individual patient characteristics.

3. Systems Biology:

- Modeling complex biological networks and cellular processes.
- Understanding signal transduction pathways and regulatory networks.
- Investigating disease pathways and molecular interactions.

4. Biotechnology:

- Design and optimization of bioprocesses for pharmaceutical and biotechnological industries.
- Predicting the behavior of bioreactors and biocatalysts.

5. Metabolic Diseases Research:

- Studying metabolic disorders and their underlying mechanisms.
- Analyzing glucose-insulin dynamics and its relevance in diabetes research.

6. Tracer Studies:

- Quantitative assessment of the kinetics of radiolabeled compounds.
- Investigating tracer distribution and clearance in the body.

7. Experimental Design:

- Designing optimal experiments to gather data for parameter estimation and model validation.
- Assessing the sensitivity of model parameters to different experimental conditions.

8. Biological Modeling in Education:

- SAAM II as an educational tool for teaching bioscience and systems modeling.
- Demonstrating concepts of pharmacokinetics and systems biology in academic settings.

9. Peer-Reviewed Publications:

- SAAM II is used in various research studies and is cited in more than 50 peer-reviewed scientific journals per year (Google Scholar).

Notably, the glucose-insulin Minimal Models that are used in clinical trials to quantify insulin improvements of antidiabetic treatments, are implemented in SAAM II.

== SAAM II Development and Distribution ==
In the early 1950s, Mones Berman and others at the NIH worked on problems in radiation dosimetry. Mones decided that compartmental models (systems of differential equations) were the best way to analyze the transient (kinetic) data being collected. He started the development of a software tool that eventually became known as SAAM. The power of SAAM was its dictionary that made it possible for a user to sketch their model, and then using the dictionary and a set of rules, create an input file directly from the sketch. SAAM took this information and created the system of differential equations that described the model. This meant that the user could think about biology/pharmacology while the program did the mathematics and statistics behind the scenes. It was a very popular program, but one had to visit the NIH and work with Mones to learn how to use the program.

Between 1986 and 1994, the University of Washington working through its Resource Center for Kinetic Analysis in the Center for Bioengineering, led by Prof David Foster with the help of Loren Zech from NIH, rewrote code including a strategic user interface, which led to SAAM II. The first version was released on the SUN in 1993. The PC version was released in 1994. Leading scientists, including Joe DiStefano, Lewis Sheiner, and Claudio Cobelli, contributed to the design and development of SAAM II. Through several grants, in the 2000-2012 period, Foster and Vicini worked on generating the modern version 2.1, including a population analysis add-on called popKinetics. In 2012, the Epsilon Group, a Medical Automation Company in Virginia licensed the commercial rights to improve and distribute the software.

Currently, SAAM II is developed and distributed by Nanomath LLC, a consulting and software company based in Washington, United States. The leadership and management of SAAM II are directed by Simone Perazzolo, a scientist specializing in computational modeling of biological and pharmacological systems.

== Education ==
SAAM II is used in teaching at several academic institutions, particularly to introduce the concept of compartmental modeling because of its intuitive visual interface.
