= Frédéric Y. Bois =

French biological scientist

Frederic Y. Bois
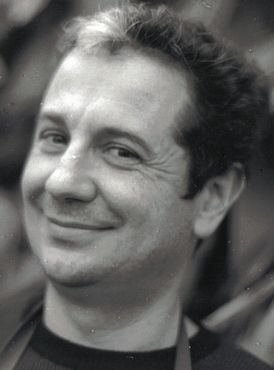
- Born: 1958 (age 67–68)
- Education: Paul Verlaine University – Metz, France
- Known for: Pharmacokinetics; Bayesian Statistics
- Awards: American Statistical Association "Outstanding Statistical Application Award"; French Epidaure Prize for Environmental Health Research; National Order of Merit (France); Ordre des Palmes Académiques
- Scientific career
- Fields: Systems Toxicology
- Workplaces: CERTARA, Simcyp division

Frédéric Yves Bois (born 1958) is a French biological scientist working in toxicology and bioinformatics. He is currently Senior Scientific Advisor at Simcyp, a Certara-owned company.

== Biography ==
Frédéric Bois was born in Limoges, France, in 1958. He obtained his Pharm.D. from the Université de Nancy (1981) and his Ph.D. from the University of Metz (1988). Most of his Ph.D. thesis, on the use of physiologically based pharmacokinetic models and stochastic carcinogenesis models for risk assessment, was developed at the Harvard University Energy and Environmental Policy Center (in Richard Wilson's group at the Jefferson Physical Laboratory). His post-doctoral research was performed at UCSF and UC Berkeley School of Public Health. He then held joint appointments at the California Environmental Protection Agency (under the direction of Dr. Lauren Zeise) and the Lawrence Berkeley National Laboratory (in the group of Dr. Joan Daisey). Upon his return to France he worked at INSERM (in the group of Pr. A.-J. Valleron) until 1998. He was Research Director at the INERIS research lab from 1999 to 2019. From 2009 to 2015 he was also incumbent of Chair of Mathematical Modelling for Systems Toxicology of the Université de Technologie de Compiègne. He is now Senior Scientific Advisor in the Simcyp division of the Certara Company. Previously married to Karen Y. Davis, he is now married to Nicole Cancré and they have four children: Pauline, Jules, Eugène and Camille.

He has been a member of the French fr:Comité de la prévention et de la précaution, scientific editor for "In Silico Pharmacology" and "Environnement, Risque et Santé"

== Work ==
Bois has worked at the Energy and Environmental Policy Center at Harvard University (1985-1987), in the research group of Pr. Richard Wilson (Jefferson Laboratory) during his PhD thesis. His work focused on physiologically based pharmacokinetic (PBPK) modeling and stochastic cancer models, applied to vinyl chloride. He then worked as a post-doctoral scientist at the University of California, San Francisco School of Pharmacy with Pr. Thomas Tozer (1988) and at the University of California, Berkeley School of Public Health (1989), focusing on Monte-Carlo based uncertainty analysis of PBPK models. During a joint appointment at the California Environmental Protection Agency and at the Lawrence Berkeley National Laboratory he developed, in collaboration with Andrew Gelman, the application of Bayesian numerical approaches to multilevel PBPK models. The impact of this work on the regulation of chemicals is discussed by Demortain. He directed several research projects for the US Food and Drug Administration, the National Institute of Health, the Environmental Protection Agency, and the Occupational Safety and Health Administration. He contributed mostly to the fields of bioequivalence testing, health risk assessment, population pharmacokinetics and Bayesian statistics. He is the developer, together with D. Mazsle, of the GNU MCSim software.

He is currently Research Director at the Institut national de l'environnement industriel et des risques (INERIS) where he coordinated the European integrated project 2FUN (https://web.archive.org/web/20131028035939/http://www.2-fun.org/), and participated in several others (ACUTEX, NANOSAFE 2, PREDICT-IV, StemBANCC). His recent work is on Physiologically based pharmacokinetic modelling, bioinformatics and systems biology.

He is member or past member of US National Research Council Standing Committee on Risk Analysis Issues and Reviews, the American Association for the Advancement of Science, the Society for Mathematical Biology, the European Science Foundation-EERO Association, the French Statistical Society, the French National Association for Technological Research. He is a recipient of the American Statistical Association "Outstanding Statistical Application Award" and of the French Epidaure Prize for Environmental Health Research.

== Positions and awards ==
For reference see Scholar

- 1984 Fall: Visiting Scientist, Division of Environmental Carcinogenesis, International Agency for Research on Cancer, Lyon, France.
- 1986-87: Research Associate, Energy and Environmental Policy Center, Harvard University, Cambridge, USA.
- 1987-88: Post-Doctoral Research Biologist, University of California Medical Center, San Francisco, USA.
- 1988-90: Post-Graduate Researcher VII, School of Public Health, University of California, Berkeley, USA.
- 1991-96: Staff Toxicologist (Specialist), Reproductive and Cancer Hazard Assessment Section, California Environmental Protection Agency, Berkeley, USA.
- 1991-99: Staff Scientist, Lawrence Berkeley Laboratory, Berkeley, USA.
- 1992-93: Maître de Conférence Associé, Faculté des Sciences Pharmaceutiques et Biologiques, Université de Nancy, France.
- 1996: October–December: Visiting Professor, School of Public Health, University of California, Berkeley, USA.
- 1995-99: Visiting Scientist, Unité INSERM 444 (Biomathématiques, Biostatistiques et Epidémiologie), Paris.
- 1999: Visiting Scientist, Lawrence Berkeley Laboratory, Berkeley, USA.
- 1999-2000: Research Scientist, INERIS, Verneuil en Hallate, France.
- 2000-04: Head of the Experimental Toxicology Laboratory, INERIS, Verneuil en Hallate, France.
- 2002: Knight, National Order of Merit (France)
- 2009-2015: Professor, Chair of Mathematical Modelling for Systems Toxicology, UTC, Compiègne, France.
- 2004-2018: Scientific Officer, Division of Chronic Risks, INERIS, Verneuil en Hallate, France.
- 2019-: Senior Scientific Advisor, Simcyp Division, Certara Inc. United Kingdom.
- 2017: Knight, Ordre des Palmes Académiques (France)

== Scientific publications ==
Lists at

- ORCID 0000-0002-4154-0391.
- Scopus Author ID 7005487412

Bois is among the top 2% most highly influential scientists according to Ioannidis, JPA; Boyack, KW; Baas, J (2020). "Updated science-wide author databases of standardized citation indicators". PLOS Biology. 18 (10) e3000918. doi:10.1371/journal.pbio.3000918. PMC 7567353. PMID 33064726. See also Elsevier Digital Commons
