= NONMEM =

Software for population pharmacokinetic modeling

NONMEM is a non-linear mixed-effects modeling software package developed by Stuart L. Beal and Lewis B. Sheiner in the late 1970s at University of California, San Francisco, and expanded by Robert Bauer at Icon PLC. Its name is an acronym for nonlinear mixed effects modeling but it is especially powerful in the context of population pharmacokinetics, pharmacometrics, and PK/PD models. NONMEM models are written in NMTRAN, a dedicated model specification language that is translated into FORTRAN, compiled on the fly and executed by a command-line script. Results are presented as text output files including tables. There are multiple interfaces to assist modelers with housekeeping of files, tracking of model development, goodness-of-fit evaluations and graphical output, such as PsN and xpose and Wings for NONMEM. Current version for NONMEM is 7.5.

== Model estimation ==
NONMEM estimates its models according to principles of maximum likelihood estimation. nonlinear mixed-effects model generally do not have close-formed solutions, and therefore specific estimation methods are applied, such as linearization methods as first-order (FO), first-order conditional (FOCE) or the laplacian (LAPL), approximation methods such as iterative-two stage (ITS), importance sampling (IMP), stochastic approximation estimation (SAEM) or direct sampling.
