= Malcolm Rowland =

British Pharmacologist

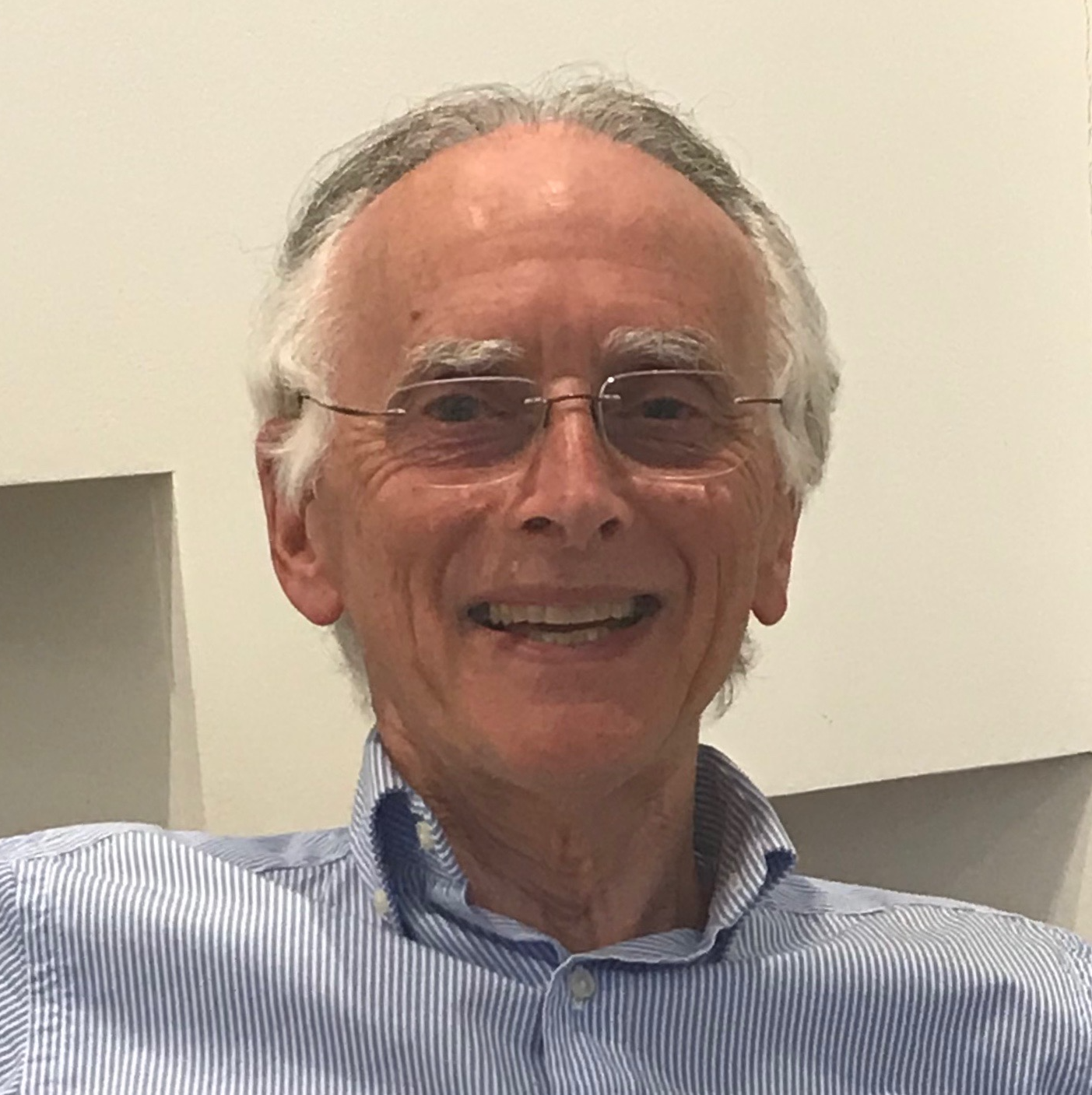
- Rowland, 2021
- Born: London, UK
- Known for: Pharmacy

Malcolm Rowland FBPhS (born 5 August 1939, in London) is Emeritus Professor of Pharmacy, University of Manchester, and adjunct professor, University of California San Francisco. His research in pharmacology, has been particularly in physiologically based pharmacokinetics (that deals with the movement in time of drugs and their metabolites within the body). He has written several textbooks on the subject.

He studied Pharmacy at Chelsea College (now Kings College), an internal college of the University of London, gaining a B.Pharm (1961) and subsequently a Ph.D. (1965).

== Academic career ==
Following his Ph.D. degree research into the pharmacokinetics of amphetamines, he took up a postdoctoral research appointment in the laboratory of Sidney Riegelman, School of Pharmacy, University of California, San Francisco (1965-1967), studying the pharmacokinetics of aspirin, and then took up a faculty position there (1967–75). While at UCSF. Rowland became a member of the joint Pharmacy-Medicine NIGMS funded program in Clinical Pharmacology, and moved his research from a prevailing descriptive approach to a more mechanistic, physiologically-based one, including the clearance concept that helped lay the foundations of modern pharmacokinetics. Together with Riegelman and Leslie Benet he founded the Journal of Pharmacokinetics and Biopharmaceutics (1973) (renamed Journal of Pharmacokinetics and Pharmacodynamics, 2001), and was a senior editor of it until 2007.

In 1975 Rowland returned to the United Kingdom to take up a position of Professor of Pharmacy, University of Manchester where he extended his research on physiologically based pharmacokinetics including development of an in silico method for predicting tissue distribution of drugs based on tissue composition and physicochemical properties. In 1983 he founded Medeval, undertaking early stage clinical evaluation of new medicines under development. Together with Brian Houston and Leon Aarons he established the Centre for Applied Pharmacokinetic Research (1996). He has promoted the application of microdosing in clinical drug development.

He headed the School of Pharmacy at Manchester on two occasions, 1988-1991 and 1998-2001, periods involving the move to clinical pharmacy and moving Pharmacy from the Faculty of Science and Engineering to the Faculty of Medicine, in recognition of the changing professional role of pharmacists from fabricator to health care advisor on medicines. Rowland has trained 90 Ph.D. students and scientists from a variety of disciplines. He also established ongoing annual postgraduate workshops in basic pharmacokinetics with Tomas Tozer (1977), and in advanced methods in pharmacokinetics and pharmacodynamics with Lewis Sheiner (1981).

Rowland was president of EUFEPS (European Federation for Pharmaceutical Sciences, 1996-1999), and a Vice-President of FIP (International Pharmaceutical Federation, 2001-2009).

== Published works ==
Rowland has published over 270 research articles in international peer-reviewed journals, and over 60 book chapters and conference reports. He co-authored with Thomas Tozer two standard textbooks: Clinical Pharmacokinetics and Pharmacodynamics: Concepts and Applications, now in its 5th edition, and Essentials of Pharmacokinetics and Pharmacodynamics.

== Honours and awards ==
He received honorary degrees from University of Poitiers, France (D.Sc.1981), Uppsala University, Sweden (FarmDhc, 1989), and Athens University, Greece ( D.Sc., 2011). He was made Fellow, Academy of Medical Sciences (2001), Fellow, British Pharmacological Society (2012), and Honorary Fellow, American College of Clinical Pharmacology (2003). He received the Scheele Award (Swedish Academy of Pharmaceutical Sciences, 1984), the Distinguished Investigator Award (American College of Clinical Pharmacology, 2007), the New Safe Medicines Faster Award (EUFEPS, 2009), Research Achievement Award in Pharmacokinetics (American Association of Pharmaceutical Scientists, 1994), the Sheiner-Beal Award in Pharmacometrics (American Society of Clinical Pharmacology and Therapeutics, 2012) and the Ariens Award (Dutch Pharmacological Society, 2020)., as well as the Harrison Memorial Medal (Royal Pharmaceutical Society of Great Britain, 1992) and Host Madsen Medal (International Pharmaceutical Federation, 2011).

== Personal life ==
Malcolm married Dawn Shane, in 1965. They have two daughters, and 5 grandchildren.
