= PKPD model =

Class of models in pharmacology

PKPD modeling (pharmacokinetic pharmacodynamic modeling) (alternatively abbreviated as PK/PD or PK-PD modeling) is a technique that combines the two classical pharmacologic disciplines of pharmacokinetics and pharmacodynamics. It integrates a pharmacokinetic and a pharmacodynamic model component into one set of mathematical expressions that allows the description of the time course of effect intensity in response to administration of a drug dose. PKPD modeling is related to the field of pharmacometrics.

Central to PKPD models is the concentration-effect or exposure-response relationship. A variety of PKPD modeling approaches exist to describe exposure-response relationships. PKPD relationships can be described by simple equations such as linear model, Emax model or sigmoid Emax model. However, if a delay is observed between the drug administration and the drug effect, a temporal dissociation needs to be taken into account and more complex models exist:

- Direct vs Indirect link PKPD models
- Direct vs Indirect response PKPD models
- Time variant vs time invariant
- Cell lifespan models
- Complex response models

PKPD modeling has its importance at each step of the drug development and it has shown its usefulness in many diseases. The Food and Drug Administration also provides guidances for Industry to recommend how exposure-response studies should be performed.
