= Scheele Award =

The Scheele Award (Scheelepriset) is a scientific award given by the Swedish Apotekarsocieteten, an organisation mainly consisting of pharmacists. The award is given to commemorate the pharmacist and chemist Carl Wilhelm Scheele (1742–1786) and has been appointed since 1961, in the beginning annually but later biannually. The award is given to "a particularly prominent and internationally renowned pharmaceutical scientist".

A symposium, the Scheele Symposium, on the topics of interest of the laureate in question is held in November, in connection with the prize ceremony.

== List of laureates ==
- 1961 Frank Rose
- 1962 Peter Doyle
- 1963 Robert Schwyzer
- 1964 Lewis H. Sarett
- 1965 Paul Janssen
- 1966 no prize was given
- 1967 Bernard B. Brodie
- 1968 Arnold Beckett
- 1969 Takeru Higuchi
- 1970 Norman J. Harper
- 1971 Albert Hofmann
- 1972 Carl Djerassi
- 1973 Harold N. MacFarland
- 1974 E.J. Ariens
- 1975 Edward P. Abraham
- 1976 Evan C. Horning
- 1977 Hans W. Kosterlitz
- 1978 Sidney Riegelman
- 1979 Peter Speiser
- 1980 Harri R. Nevanlinna
- 1981 George Aghajanian
- 1982 Charles Weissmann
- 1983 James W. Black
- 1984 Malcolm Rowland
- 1985 Stanley S. Davis
- 1986 Luc Montagnier
- 1987 Roland W. Frei
- 1988 David V. Goeddel
- 1989 Dennis V. Parke
- 1990 Gerhard Levy
- 1991 K. Barry Sharpless
- 1992 Koji Nakanishi
- 1993 Alexander T. Florence
- 1994 Greg Winter
- 1995 Patrik J. Hendra
- 1996 Gordon L. Amidon
- 1997 Julian E. Davies
- 1998 Albert I. Wertheimer
- 1999 John W. Daly
- 2000 Douwe Breimer
- 2001 Andrew H. Wyllie
- 2003 Jonathan A. Ellman
- 2005 Jan van der Greef
- 2007 Mathias Uhlén
- 2009 Dennis J. Slamon
- 2011 Kathleen Giacomini
- 2013 Garret A. FitzGerald
- 2015 Robert S. Langer
- 2017 Charles Sawyers
- 2019 Emmanuelle Charpentier
- 2021 Craig Crews
- 2023 Peter G. Schultz
- 2025 Pieter Cullis
