= Model-Informed Precision Dosing =

Model-Informed Precision Dosing (MIPD for short) is the use of pharmacometric models with computer software to optimize drug dosage for an individual patient. Developed in the late 1960s under the impetus of clinical pharmacologists such as Lewis Sheiner and Roger Jelliffe, these approaches involve applying the equations and parameters describing a drug's pharmacokinetics and pharmacodynamics to define the best dosage regimen for a given individual, likely to produce circulating concentrations associated with maximum efficacy and minimum toxicity. Models typically take into account the patient's demographic characteristics (e.g., age, gender, ethnicity), clinical profile (e.g., body measurements, renal and hepatic function, comorbidities, co-medications, dietary habits, substances use) and possibly genetic factors (e.g., polymorphisms affecting cytochromes or drug transporters). When starting a treatment, these models can be used to select a priori the optimal dosage for a patient, based on simulations. During the treatment course, these same models can be used to integrate the results of Therapeutic Drug Monitoring (i.e., the measurement and medical interpretation of circulating drug concentrations) or the measurement of biomarkers of efficacy or toxicity, in an a posteriori approach to dose optimization, derived from Bayesian inference and feedback loops.

Practically, these approaches make extensive use of computer software dedicated to the clinical use of pharmacokinetic/pharmacodynamic models, belonging to the computerized clinical decision support tools. They complement Model-Informed Drug Development (MIDD), which is mainly carried out by pharmaceutical industry researchers prior to marketing. Prescribers are expected to make increasingly regular use of model-driven precision dosing tools for patient treatment and follow-up. Dosage individualization represents the quantitative aspect of precision medicine, while the qualitative aspect lies in the personalized choice of the best drug to treat a given pathology. This optimization of dose selection is especially desirable for drugs with narrow therapeutic index (i.e., effective concentration close to toxic ones). It is also important when a treatment is to be applied to patients with peculiarities, such as children, frail elderly persons, polymorbid patients or those already heavily treated.

In terms of clinical utility, multiple studies have demonstrated that MIPD improves attainment of predefined exposure targets compared with conventional dosing approaches. This has been consistently shown for antimicrobials, immunosuppressants, and chemotherapeutic agents. By avoiding excessive exposure, MIPD has been associated with reduced incidence of dose-related toxicities. For example, Bayesian-guided vancomycin dosing has been linked to lower rates of acute kidney injury. While evidence for improved clinical outcomes is growing, it remains heterogeneous. Some studies report reductions in treatment failure, hospital length of stay, and mortality, whereas others demonstrate primarily pharmacokinetic benefits. Ongoing randomized controlled trials aim to establish stronger links between MIPD and endpoints.

One of the key limitations of MIPD is that performance depends on the quality and relevance of underlying models. Population models may not generalize well to underrepresented populations, and missing or inaccurate data can compromise predictions. Moreover, despite the potential of MIPD, widespread adoption rremains limited. Technical hurdles still limit integration of this approach in clinical practice, such as lack of clinician familiarity, time constraints, workflow integration issues, and limited access to validated software tools. The use of MIPD also raises regulatory questions regarding accountability for dosing decisions and model transparency.

== See also ==
- Clinical decision support system
- Pharmacometrics
- Pharmacokinetics
- Pharmacodynamics
- Therapeutic drug monitoring
- Precision medicine
- Personalized medicine
- Bayesian inference
- Therapeutic index
