= Stanley Stewart Davis =

British academic (born 1942)

- Born: 1942 (age 83–84); Warwick, England
- Education: University of London
- Awards: Scheele Award
- Scientific career
- Fields: Chemistry
- Workplaces: University of Nottingham

Stanley Stuart (Bob) Davis (born 17 December 1942) is emeritus professor of pharmacy at the University of Nottingham.

== Early life and education ==
Davis was born in Warwick, England. He obtained his bachelor's degree in pharmacy from the School of Pharmacy at the University of London in 1964. He remained at the same university to study for a PhD in colloid science (1967).

== Academic career ==
In 1966 he was appointed assistant lecturer in pharmaceutics and then to lecturer in 1967. He was awarded his Doctor of Science degree (higher doctorate) in 1982. In 1968 he was awarded a one-year Fulbright Scholarship to undertake postdoctoral studies with Takeru Higuchi at the University of Kansas, US, in the field of solution thermodynamics.

In 1970 he moved to the University of Aston in Birmingham as senior lecturer and head of the pharmaceutics section. Here, he built up an active research group in drug delivery systems. Davis took the position of Lord Trent Professor of Pharmacy at the University of Nottingham in 1975, where he ran a large research group, studying novel drug delivery systems. Topics of research have included drug targeting (with particular emphasis on colloidal carriers), transmucosal delivery, oral and parenteral systems for controlled release and product evaluation through gamma scintigraphy. He became an emeritus professor in 2003.

He has published over 750 papers and is co-editor of 7 books. He is the named inventor on numerous patents dealing with drug delivery. He is the founder and chairman of Cosmas-Damian a consulting company that provides services to the pharmaceutical and biotechnology industries. This company has been in existence for more than 25 years and is based on his extensive experience. He is also the co-founder of three pharmaceutical companies; CDD (Co-ordinated Drug Development) (since acquired by Vectura Group); Danbiosyst (UK) Ltd (sold to West Pharmaceutical Services and then to Archimedes) and Pharmaceutical Profiles Ltd.

=== Other work ===
He has acted as a consultant to various pharmaceutical companies and has worked as a visiting scientist at Syntex, Allergan, and Alza. He has served on numerous committees and panels, to include those of the British and European Pharmacopoeias, the United Kingdom Medicines Commission, The Science & Engineering Research Council.

== Awards and recognition ==
Davis has received The Science Medal (The British Pharmaceutical Conference, 1971), The Scheele Award (Swedish Pharmaceutical Association, 1985), The Maurice-Marie Janot Award (APGI, France, 1986) (The Harrison Memorial Medal, Royal Pharmaceutical Society of Great Britain, 2000), The Eurand Career Achievement Award for Outstanding Research in Oral Drug Delivery. The Controlled Release Society, 2003. The Hoest Madsen Medal (FIP) (2005).
