= Leslie Z. Benet =

American pharmaceutical scientist

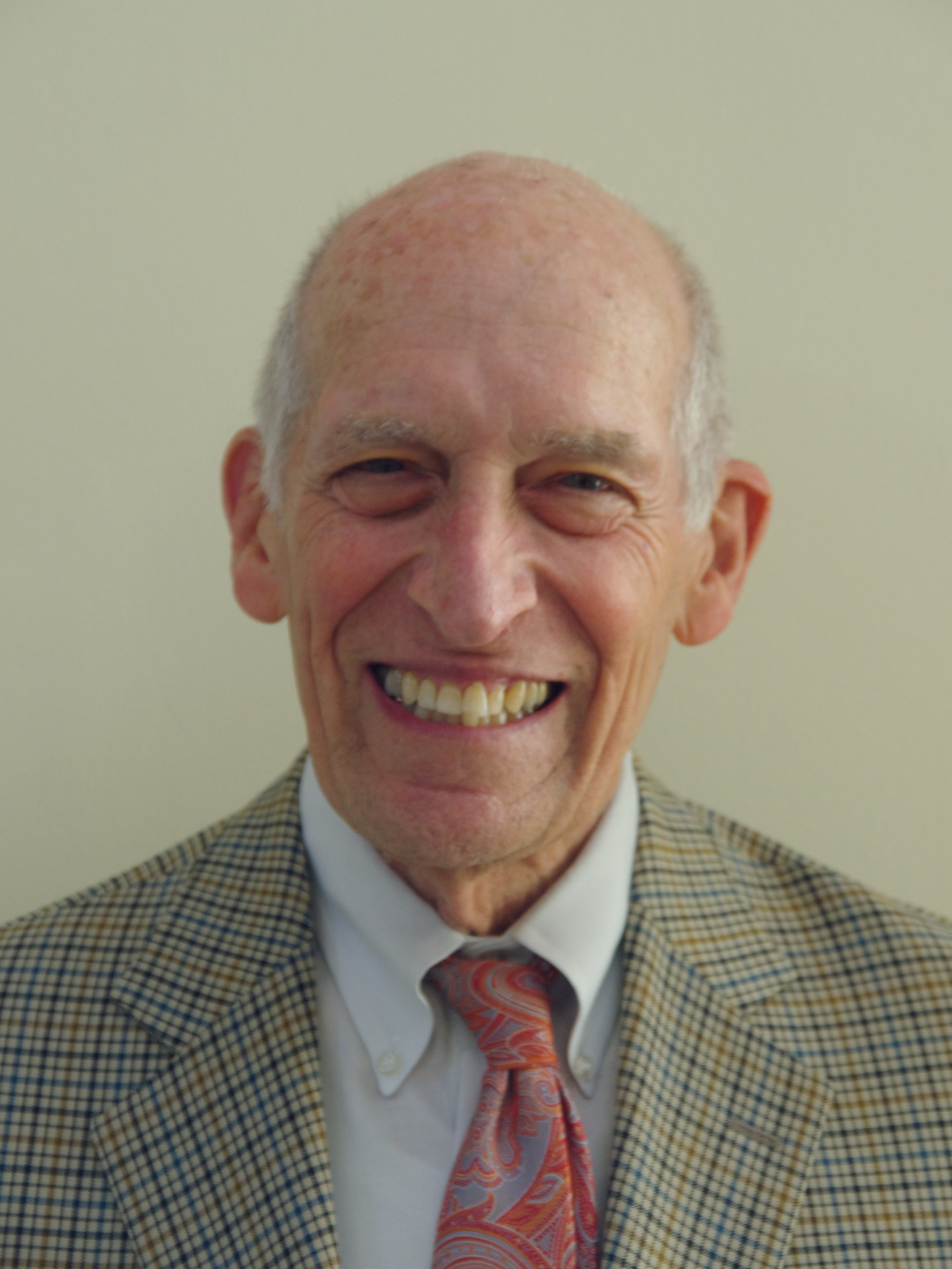
- Leslie Z. Benet aged 86
- Born: May 17, 1937 (age 89); Cincinnati, Ohio
- Occupations: Department of Bioengineering and Therapeutic Sciences, School of Pharmacy and Medicine, University of California
- Title: Professor
- Spouse: Carol

Academic background
- Education: UCSF
- Thesis: Thermodynamics of Chelation by Tetracyclines (1965)
- Doctoral advisor: Jere Goyan

Academic work
- Discipline: Pharmacology
- Sub-discipline: Pharmacokinetics, Pharmacodynamics, Bioequivalence
- Institutions: Washington State University, University of California
- Website: medicine.ucsf.edu/people/leslie-benet

Leslie 'Les' Zachary Benet (born May 17, 1937) is an influential pharmaceutical scientist heading the UCSF's Benet Lab at the Department of Bioengineering and Therapeutic Sciences and recipient of the Remington Medal for distinguished service to American pharmacy.

== Early life and education ==
Leslie Zachary Benet was born on May 17, 1937, in Cincinnati, Ohio, into a family of pharmacists. His father, Jonas and his uncle, Harry, opened Benet's Pharmacies in Cincinnati in the 1930s and in 1942 founded DARA Products, the first drug company to manufacture hypoallergenic dermatologicals.

Benet received his B.A. (English, 1959), B.S. (Pharmacy, 1960), M.S. (Pharmaceutical Chemistry, 1962) from the University of Michigan and Ph.D. (Pharmaceutical Chemistry, 1965) from the University of California.

== Academic career ==
Benet's early work included noncompartmental methods for calculating clearance and volume of distribution. His paper on the volume of distribution is the most highly cited article in the Journal of Pharmaceutical Sciences (cited more than 900 times out of 19,000 articles). In 1986 he was a founder and first president of the American Association of Pharmaceutical Scientists. For over twenty years, Benet chaired the Department of Pharmacy at the UCSF which, under his leadership, became the Department of Biopharmaceutical Sciences. He supervised 59 Ph.D. theses and more than 140 post-doc students. Benet regularly advised the FDA in proposing guidance in the field of bioequivalence. His recent work extended the Biopharmaceutics Classification System, leading to the Biopharmaceutics Drug Disposition Classification System allowing the prediction of enzymes and transporters, transporter-enzyme interplay and transporter-transporter interplay for new molecular entities and drug-drug interactions for already marketed drugs. Benet is listed as one of the "25 Top Pharmacy Professors" in the USA.

== Published works ==
Benet published over 630 articles in peer-reviewed journals, more than 100 book chapters, and seven books. According to Google Scholar his publications have been cited on more than 65,000 occasions.

== Honors and awards ==
=== Honorary degrees ===
- Uppsala University, Sweden (Pharm.D., 1987)
- Leiden University, The Netherlands (Ph.D., 1995)
- University of Illinois at Chicago (D.Sc., 1997)
- Philadelphia College of Pharmacy and Science (D.Sc., 1997)
- Long Island University (D.Sc., 1999)
- University of Athens, Greece (Ph.D., 2005)
- Catholic University of Leuven, Belgium (Ph.D., 2010)
- University of Michigan (D.Sc., 2011)
- University of Lisbon, Portugal (Ph.D., 2016)

=== Scientific/professional honors and awards ===
- Distinguished Alumnus Award (University of Michigan College of Pharmacy, 1982)
- Research Achievement Award in Pharmaceutics (Academy of Pharmaceutical Sciences, 1982)

 Elected to the US National Academy of Medicine (1987)

- Distinguished Service Award (ACCP, 1988)
- Distinguished Scientist Award (AAPS, 1989)*
- Rho Chi Society Lecture Award (The Rho Chi Society, 1990)
- Volwiler Distinguished Research Achievement Award (AACP, 1991)
- Distinguished Service Profile Award (American Foundation for Pharmaceutical Education, 1993)
- Rawls-Palmer Progress in Medicine Award (American Society for Clinical Pharmacology and Therapeutics, 1995)
- Distinguished Service Award (AAPS, 1996)
- Takeru Higuchi Research Prize (APhA, 2000)
- Wurster Research Award in Pharmaceutics (AAPS, 2000)
- Høst-Madsen Medal (FIP, 2001)
- Research Achievement Award in Pharmaceutical Sciences (Pharmaceutical Sciences World Congress, 2004)
- Career Achievement Award in Oral Drug Delivery (Controlled Release Society, 2004)
- Paul Ehrlich Magic-Bullet Lifetime Achievement Award (Nürnberg, Germany, 2008)
- Oscar B. Hunter Memorial Award in Therapeutics (American Society for Clinical Pharmacology and Therapeutics, 2010)
- Distinguished Investigator Award (ACCP, 2011)
- APhA-APRS Ebert Prize (American Pharmacists Association – Academy of Pharmaceutical Research and Science, 2013)
- North American Scientific Achievement Award (International Society for the Study of Xenobiotics, 2015)
- Remington Medal (2016)
- Lifetime Achievement Award (Frankfurt Foundation Quality of Medicines, 2023)

=== Teaching awards ===
- Academic Senate Distinguished Teaching Award (UCSF, 1973)
- Long Teaching Award for Excellence in Teaching (UCSF School of Pharmacy, 1990)
- Outstanding Faculty Mentorship Award (UCSF Graduate Division, 2001 and 2016)
