= George Aghajanian =

Pioneer in neuropharmacology (1932–2023)

- Born: April 14, 1932; Beirut, Lebanon
- Died: July 4, 2023 (aged 91)
- Education: Cornell University (A.B.); Yale University School of Medicine (MD)
- Scientific career
- Fields: Psychiatry; Neuropharmacology
- Institutions: Yale School of Medicine

George K. Aghajanian (April 14, 1932 – July 4, 2023) was an American psychiatrist who was Emeritus Foundations Fund Professor at the Yale School of Medicine, New Haven, Connecticut, in the Department of Psychiatry. He was a pioneer in the area of neuropharmacology. He also served as a member of the NARSAD Scientific Advisory Board.

== Early life and education ==
George Aghajanian was of Armenian descent and was born on April 14, 1932, in Beirut, Lebanon. He received his B.A. from Cornell University, followed by his Doctor of Medicine at Yale University.

== Career ==
Aghajanian was a medical officer in the United States Army in the starting days of his career. He served different positions at the Yale School of Medicine, including assistant professor of psychiatry, professor of psychiatry and pharmacology, and Foundations Fund professor of research in psychiatry.

George Aghajanian died on July 4, 2023, at the age of 91.

== Research ==
Aghajanian investigated the actions of LSD by which it produces hallucinations in the brain, and uncovered the therapeutic mechanism of atypical antipsychotic drugs. He also found that application of serotonin (5-HT) produces an increase in the frequency and amplitude of spontaneous excitatory postsynaptic potentials in layer V pyramidal cells of the neocortex and transitional cortex by whole-cell recording in rat brain slices. He did further research on the structure and mechanism of psychotropic drugs and neurotransmitters.

== Awards and honors ==
Aghajanian received the CINP Pioneer Award from the International College of Neuropsychopharmacology. He also received the Lieber Prize for research on schizophrenia. Additional awards include the Daniel H. Efron Research Award and the Julius Axelrod Mentorship Award from the American College of Neuropsychopharmacology, the Scheele Award from the Swedish Academy of Pharmacy, the Heffter Award from the Heffter Research Institute, and election to the National Academy of Medicine.

== Selected publications ==
- George K Aghajanian: Modeling "psychosis" in vitro by inducing disordered neuronal network activity in cortical brain slices. Psychopharmacology.
- George Aghajanian, Benjamin S Bunney, and Philip S Holzman: Patricia Goldman-Rakic, 1937–2003. Neuropsychopharmacology.
- George K Aghajanian and Gerard J Marek: Serotonin model of schizophrenia: emerging role of glutamate mechanisms. Brain Research Reviews.
- George K Aghajanian and Gerard J Marek: Serotonin–Glutamate Interactions: A New Target for Antipsychotic Drugs. Neuropsychopharmacology.
- George K.Aghajanian and Gerard J Marek: Serotonin, via 5-HT2A receptors, increases EPSCs in layer V pyramidal cells of prefrontal cortex by an asynchronous mode of glutamate release. Brain Research.
- Ronald S Duman, George K Aghajanian, Gerard Sanacora, and John H Krystal: Synaptic plasticity and depression: new insights from stress and rapid-acting antidepressants. Nature Medicine.
- Ronald S Duman and George K Aghajanian: Neurobiology of Rapid Acting Antidepressants: Role of BDNF and GSK-3β. Neuropsychopharmacology.
- Ronald S. Duman and George K. Aghajanian: Synaptic Dysfunction in Depression: Potential Therapeutic Targets. Science.
