= Remington Medal =

Award from American Pharmacists Association

A picture of the Remington Medal.

The Remington Honor Medal, named for eminent community pharmacist, manufacturer, and educator Joseph P. Remington (1847–1918), was established in 1918 to recognize distinguished service on behalf of American pharmacy during the preceding year, culminating in the past year, or during a long period of outstanding activity or fruitful achievement.

Awarded annually by the American Pharmacists Association, the Remington Medal is the highest recognition given in the profession of pharmacy in the US.

== Past recipients ==
- 1919 James Hartley Beal
- 1920 John Uri Lloyd
- 1922 Henry Vincome Arny
- 1923 Henry Hurd Rusby
- 1924 George Mahlon Beringer
- 1925 Henry Milton Whelpley
- 1926 Henry A. B. Dunning
- 1928 Charles H. LaWall
- 1929 Wilbur Lincoln Scoville
- 1930 Edward Kremers
- 1931 Ernest Fullerton Cook
- 1932 Eugene G. Eberle
- 1933 Evander F. Kelly
- 1934 Sir Henry S. Wellcome
- 1935 Samuel Louis Hilton
- 1936 Edmund N. Gathercoal
- 1937 J. Leon Lascoff
- 1938 Henry C. Christensen
- 1940 Robert L. Swain
- 1941 George D. Beal
- 1942 Josiah K. Lilly Sr.
- 1943 Robert P. Fischelis
- 1944 H. Evert Kendig
- 1945 Joseph Rosin
- 1947 Rufus Ashley Lyman
- 1948 Andrew Grover DuMez
- 1949 Ernest Little
- 1950 Edwin Leigh Newcomb
- 1951 Hugo H. Schaefer
- 1952 Patrick Henry Costello
- 1953 Hugh C. Muldoon
- 1955 Roy Bird Cook
- 1956 Frank W. Moudry
- 1957 W. Paul Briggs
- 1958 Eli Lilly, Jr.
- 1959 Justin L. Powers
- 1960 Ivor Griffith
- 1962 Harry J. Anslinger
- 1963 Glenn L. Jenkins
- 1964 Robert A. Hardt
- 1965 K. K. Chen
- 1967 William S. Apple
- 1969 George F. Archambault
- 1970 Donald E. Francke
- 1971 Linwood F. Tice
- 1972 Glenn Sonnedecker
- 1973 Grover C. Bowles
- 1974 Lloyd M. Parks
- 1975 Albert Doerr
- 1976 Melvin W. Green
- 1977 David J. Krigstein
- 1978 Eugene V. White
- 1980 Joseph D. Williams
- 1983 Takeru Higuchi
- 1984 William M. Heller
- 1985 William L. Blockstein
- 1986 Irving Rubin
- 1987 Gloria N. Francke
- 1988 Peter P. Lamy
- 1989 Lawrence C. Weaver
- 1990 Joseph A. Oddis
- 1991 George B. Griffenhagen
- 1992 Jere E. Goyan
- 1993 Robert C. Johnson
- 1994 James T. Doluisio
- 1995 Max W. Eggleston
- 1996 Maurice Q. Bectel
- 1997 C. Douglas Hepler, Linda M. Strand
- 1998 Kenneth N. Barker
- 1999 Carl F. Emswiller, Jr.
- 2000 Daniel A. Nona
- 2001 Jerome A. Halperin
- 2002 Richard P. Penna
- 2003 Mary Louise Andersen
- 2004 Lowell J. Anderson
- 2005 Robert J. Osterhaus
- 2006 Robert D. Gibson
- 2007 Ernest Mario
- 2008 J. Lyle Bootman
- 2009 John A. Gans
- 2010 Mary Anne Koda-Kimble
- 2011 Paul W. Lofholm
- 2012 William E. Evans
- 2013 Dennis K. Helling
- 2014 Marilyn K. Speedie
- 2015 Calvin H. Knowlton
- 2016 Leslie Z. Benet
- 2017 Daniel A. Hussar
- 2018 Harold N. Godwin
- 2019 Lucinda L. Maine
- 2020 John D. Grabenstein
- 2021 Marialice Bennett
- 2023 Henri R. Manasse Jr.
- 2024 Milap C. Nahata
- 2025 Stephen W. Schondelmeyer

== See also ==
- List of chemistry awards
- List of medicine awards
