= James Hartley Beal =

American politician

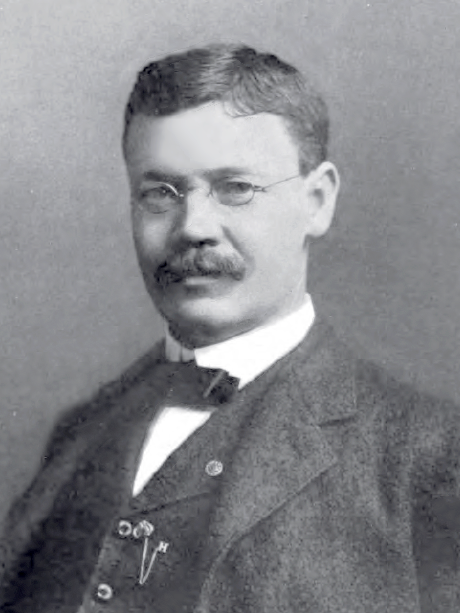
- circa 1915
- Born: September 23, 1861; New Philadelphia, Ohio
- Died: September 20, 1945 (aged 83); Okaloosa County, Florida
- Resting place: Brooks Memorial Cemetery, Fort Walton Beach, Florida
- Education: Scio College; University of Michigan; Cincinnati Law School

James Hartley Beal (September 23, 1861 – September 20, 1945) was an educator, legislator, author, and pharmacist in the U.S. State of Ohio who was the first recipient of the Remington Medal for distinguished service to American pharmacy.

== Biography ==
James Hartley Beal was born at New Philadelphia, Ohio in 1861. He was educated at the public schools, Scio College, the University of Michigan and the Cincinnati Law School. After graduating from law school in 1886, he was married to Fannie Snyder Young of Uhrichsville, Ohio, and had two children. In 1889, Beal organized the Scio College of Pharmacy, and was its dean from the start.

From 1902 to 1904, he represented Harrison County in the Ohio House of Representatives, and authored the Beal Local Option Law.

In 1902 to 1904, Beal was acting president of Scio College, professor of theory and practice of pharmacy at the Pittsburg College of Pharmacy, and editor of the Midland Druggist of Columbus, Ohio.

In 1904 to 1905, Beal was president of the American Pharmacists Association. He authored Chemical and Pharmaceutical Arithmetic, Prescription Practice and General Dispensing, Pharmaceutical Interrogations, The Era Course in Pharmacy and others.

Beal was awarded the first Remington Medal in 1919 for distinguished service to American pharmacy. He was chairman of the board of trustees of the U. S. Pharmacopeia from 1910 to 1940.

He acquired a massive shell collection at his home in Florida.

Beal died in 1945 in Okaloosa County, Florida. The Beal Award was first given in 2000 for distinguished volunteer service to the U. S. Pharmacopeia, and was named for Beal and his son.

Ohio House of Representatives
Preceded by Samuel S. Hamill	Representative from Harrison County; 1902–1904	Succeeded by Thomas H. Watson
