= John Adikes Bond =

American author, attorney, poker player, political activist, and real estate developer

- Born: John Adikes Bond; January 14, 1955 (age 71); Jamaica, New York, United States
- Writing career
- Years active: 1998–present

John Adikes Bond (born January 14, 1955) is an author, attorney, poker player, political activist and real estate developer born in Jamaica, New York. He grew up in Massapequa and Port Washington, New York before moving to South Florida in 1972. He currently resides between Dania Beach, Florida and Andros Island, the Bahamas. He is the eldest of five children; his brother James Alexander Bond is a theatre director in New York City.

From February 1992 – July 2010 Bond co-authored with his collaborator and co-author Roy Cooke, a poker column, Real Poker, for Card Player Magazine. It is the longest continuously running poker feature in the world.

Bond was the developer of Atlantis the Water Kingdom which became the Six Flags Atlantis water theme park in Hollywood Florida from 1979 to 1983.

== Author ==
Bond's short story "T-Bird", originally published in the collection Miami Noir (Les Standiford, ed.) by Akashic Press, was chosen for Best American Mystery Stories 2007, (Carl Hiaasen, ed.) A second mystery story, "Trapped", set in the same world of Miami's underground poker circuit, appeared in the 2010 crime story collection Florida Heat Wave (Michael Lister, editor.)

Bond was editor of the twice-weekly newspaper The Beach Journal (renamed the Atlantic Journal) from 1977 to 1979.

In the 1980s he served as editor of the Broward Sierra News and BROWBEAT, the Broward Mensa journal.

Bond has numerous miscellaneous publications including The Practical Real Estate Lawyer, FloridaBookReview.Com, Tropic Magazine of The Miami Herald, Miami Magazine and the Fort Lauderdale Sun-Sentinel (Travel Section). He was a contributing real estate columnist for The Miami Herald from 1990 to 1993.

Books (co-authored with Roy Cooke)
Real Poker: The Cooke Collection (MCU Press, 1999)
Real Poker II: The Play of Hands (1st edition MCU Press 2001)
Real Poker II: The Play of Hands (2nd edition ConJelCo Publishing 2005)
Cooke's Rules of Real Poker (ConJelCo Publishing, 2005)
The Home Poker Handbook (ConJelCo Publishing, 2007)
How to Think Like a Poker Pro (ConJelCo Publishing, 2008)
How to Play Like a Poker Pro (ConJelCo Publishing, 2008)

The forewords to Cooke and Bond's books have been written by major poker figures David Sklansky, Mike Caro, Linda Johnson, Mike Sexton, Daniel Negreanu, Chris Ferguson, and Phil Gordon.

== Political activity ==
Bond worked in the late 1970s for National Projects, owned by Miami lobbyist Stephen Paul Ross. He co-managed political campaigns for Nikki Beare for the Florida House of Representatives (1974), Elayne Weisburd the first woman elected to the Miami Beach City Commission (1977) and civil rights pioneer Reverend Theodore Gibson the first African-American elected to the Miami City Commission (re-election campaign, 1977).

Bond was Vice President of Dade County Young Democrats (1977). He was a member of the Broward County Democratic Executive Committee (1980–82) and Vice President of the Hollywood (FL) Democratic Club (1982).

Bond ran unsuccessfully for the Florida House of Representatives (1980) and Hollywood City Commission (1982.)

Bond was a member of the Finance Committee of the Steve Pajcic for Governor Campaign (1986) and John Glenn for President Campaign (1983–84). On the Glenn campaign he worked closely with Glenn's wife Annie Glenn and Bond's Fort Lauderdale neighbor, Apollo astronaut Donn Eisele. Together Bond and Eisele raised almost a quarter million dollars for Glenn.

== Other interests ==
Bond was one of the first Florida attorneys Board-certified in Real Property law. He served on the board of directors of the Florida Association of Realtors (1989–93) and was the South Broward Board of Realtors Realtor of the Year (1992).

Bond became a Professional Association of Diving Instructors (PADI) Open Water SCUBA Instructor in 1983. He achieved PADI's highest rating, Course Director (Instructor Trainer) in 1986. In the 1970s and 80s he served intermittently as a divemaster at Small Hope Bay Lodge the first dive resort in the Bahamas. Bond is a USCG licensed commercial boat captain.

== Education ==
Paul D. Schreiber Public High School, 1972

BA, (Anthropology) University of Miami, 1975

JD University of Miami School of Law, 1978

Certification in Data Processing, Prospect Hall College, 1981

Certification, Spanish Language, Universidad Internacional, 1983

American Film Institute Screenwriting Program, 1996

MFA (Creative Writing) Florida International University, 2001
