= Charles Weissmann =

Hungarian-Swiss biologist (1931–2025)

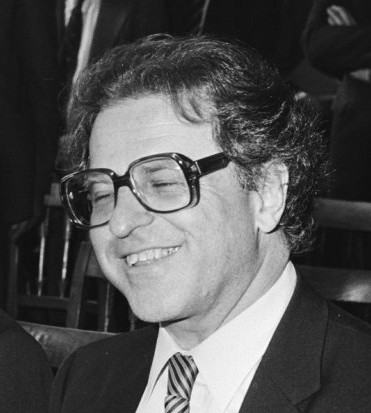
- Weissmann in 1982
- Born: 14 October 1931; Budapest, Hungary
- Died: 11 December 2025 (aged 94)
- Education: University of Zurich

Charles Weissmann (14 October 1931 – 11 December 2025) was a Jewish Hungarian-born Swiss molecular biologist. Weissmann is particularly known for the first cloning and expression of interferon and his contributions to the unraveling of the molecular genetics of neurogenerative prion diseases such as scrapie, Creutzfeldt–Jakob disease, and "mad cow disease".

== Life and career ==
Charles Weissmann was born into a Jewish family in 1931 in Budapest as Karolyi, but his family soon moved to Zürich, where his father worked as a successful businessman. In 1940, fearing a Nazi invasion of Switzerland, the family fled to Paris, where they missed the Nazis' arrival by a few days, moved on to Lisbon, and "[a]s it was impossible to secure a U.S. visa", they fled to Rio de Janeiro as refugees in 1941. In 1946, after the war, they returned to Zurich.

Weissmann went to University of Zurich and obtained his MD in 1956 and Ph.D. in organic chemistry in 1961. In 1978, Weissmann co-founded the biotech company Biogen in Geneva. Biogen is considered one of the pioneers of the biotechnology industries. Weissmann was director of the Institute for Molecular Biology in Zurich, President of the Roche Research Foundation and co-founder and Member of the Scientific Council of Biogen. He was Chairman of the Department of Infectology, Scripps Florida until 2011.

He won several awards, including the Otto Warburg Medal (1980) and the Scheele Award (1982). A member of the American Society for Biochemistry and Molecular Biology and the Deutsche Akademie der Naturforscher Leopoldina he was also a Foreign Associate of the U.S. National Academy of Sciences, the Royal Society (UK) and the Pour le Mérite (Germany). On 16 May 2011, Weissmann became Doctor of Science Honoris Causa at New York University.

Weissmann died on 11 December 2025, at the age of 94.

== Awards ==
- Sir Hans Krebs Medal (1974).
- Otto Warburg Medal (1980).
- Scheele Award (1982).
- Wilhelm Exner Medal (1996).
- Max Delbrück Medal (1997)
- Mendel Medal (1998)
