= Joseph D. Williams (executive) =

American executive

Joseph D. Williams (1926–2021) was an American business executive who was chief executive officer (CEO) of Parke-Davis and later of Warner-Lambert during the early 1980s.

== Early life and education ==
Williams was born in 1926 in Washington, D.C. He developed an interest in pharmacy as a youth by working at his grandfather's drugstore in Pawnee City, Nebraska. Williams served in the United States Navy during World War II, after which he attended the University of Nebraska College of Pharmacy on the G.I. Bill. He earned a bachelor's degree in chemistry and pharmacy from the University of Nebraska, becoming a registered pharmacist.

== Career ==
After completing his studies, Williams joined Parke-Davis in 1950 as a traveling sales representative. He advanced within the firm, a vice president by 1970, and eventually president and chief executive in the early 1970s. When Warner-Lambert acquired Parke-Davis in 1970, Williams transitioned to Warner-Lambert's leadership team, becoming president of its pharmaceutical division in 1976 and president of the company in 1979.

Later in 1979, Williams assumed the role of chief executive officer at Warner-Lambert, and was named chairman in the mid-1980s. He remained in these positions until his retirement in 1991. During this period, Warner-Lambert initiated a restructuring program to address declining profits, divesting non-core subsidiaries and improving operational efficiency. Under Williams's tenure, the company increased its investment in research and development, recruited scientific personnel and focused on prescription medications, including the cholesterol-lowering drug Lopid (gemfibrozil). These measures increased Warner-Lambert's profitability, with annual revenues exceeding $4 billion by the end of the 1980s.

In addition, Williams was on the boards of AT&T, Exxon, and J.C. Penney. After retiring as CEO in 1991, he continued to advise Warner-Lambert as chairman of its executive committee and as a consultant.

== Personal life ==
Joseph D. Williams was married to Millie E. Williams, and together they were active in philanthropic and educational causes. In 2014, the University of Nebraska Medical Center (UNMC) named the Joseph D. & Millie E. Williams Science Hall on its Omaha campus in honor of the couple's support. Williams also helped establish an endowed faculty chair (the Parke-Davis Chair in Pharmaceutics) and scholarship funds at the UNMC College of Pharmacy.

== Awards and recognition ==
- Remington Medal (1980)
- Hugo H. Schaefer Award (1987)
- Legion of Merit Award (2014)
