= Joseph Rosin =

Joseph Rosin (August 4, 1878 - July 3, 1969) was a chemist and a vice president at Merck and the recipient of the 1945 Remington Medal for contributions to pharmacy. He wrote Reagent Chemicals and Standards, a reference for chemists which saw numerous editions published. He also served as the congregation president of Temple Sholom in Plainfield, NJ from 1934-1935.
