= MCSim =

Simulation software suite

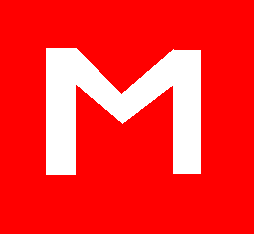
- Original authors: Don Maszle, Frederic Y. Bois
- Developer: GNU Project
- Initial release: 1991; 35 years ago
- Stable release: 6.2.0 / 3 June 2020; 5 years ago
- Written in: C
- Operating system: Cross-platform
- Type: Numerical analysis
- License: GNU General Public License
- Website: www.gnu.org/software/mcsim
- Repository: cvs.savannah.gnu.org/viewvc/?root=mcsim

GNU MCSim is a suite of simulation software. It allows users to design statistical or simulation models, perform Monte Carlo simulations, and Bayesian inference through (tempered) Markov chain Monte Carlo (MCMC) simulations. The latest version allows parallel computing of Monte Carlo or MCMC simulations.

== Description ==
GNU MCSim is a simulation and statistical inference tool for algebraic or differential equation systems, optimized for performing Monte Carlo analysis. The software comprises a model generator and a simulation engine:

- The model generator facilitates structural model definition and maintenance, while keeping execution time short. The model is coded using a simple grammar, and the generator translates it into source code for C. Starting with version 5.3.0, models coded in Systems Biology Markup Language (SBML) can also be used.
- The simulation engine is a set of routines that are linked to the model to produce executable code. The result is that simulations of a structural model can be run under a variety of conditions.

Internally, the software uses the GNU Scientific Library for some of its numerical calculations.

== History ==
The project began in 1991 in Berkeley when Don Maszle and Frederic Y. Bois translated in C and reorganized a program that Bois had developed at Harvard for his PhD thesis. The main motive for the work was to be able to quickly develop and easily maintain physiologically based pharmacokinetic modelling (PBPK) models. However, the syntax was defined with enough generality that many algebraic and first-order ordinary differential equations can be solved. The ability to perform efficient Monte Carlo simulations was added early on, for the research needs of the group. The code was made freely available from a server at UC Berkeley. Discussions with Stuart Beal at University of California, San Francisco (UCSF) School of Pharmacy, led the team to investigate the use of Markov chain Monte Carlo techniques for PBPK models' calibration. The corresponding code was developed by Maszle, during a project in collaboration with Andrew Gelman, then professor at University of California, Berkeley (UC Berkeley) Statistics Department. Additional code written by Ken Revzan allowed the definition and Bayesian calibration of hierarchical (multilevel) statistical models. At the time of these developments (around 1996), those abilities were unique for a freely distributed, easily accessible, very powerful and versatile software. Since then the software has been consistently maintained and extended.

=== Version history ===
- 6.2.0 (3 June 2020)
- 6.1.0 (19 February 2019)
- 6.0.1 (5 May 2018)
- 6.0.0 (24 February 2018)
- 5.6.6 (21 January 2017)
- 5.6.5 (27 February 2016)
- 5.6.4 (30 January 2016)
- 5.6.3 (1 January 2016)
- 5.6.2 (24 December 2015)
- 5.6.1 (21 December 2015)
- 5.6.0 (16 December 2015)
- 5.5.0 (17 March 2013)
- 5.4.0 (18 January 2011)
- 5.3.1 (3 March 2009)
- 5.3.0 (12 January 2009)
- 5.2 beta (29 January 2008)
- 5.1beta (18 September 2006)
- 5.0.0 (4 January 2005)
- 4.2.0 (15 October 2001)
- 4.1.0 (1 August 1997)
- 4.0.0 (24 March 1997)
- 3.6.0
- 3.3.2

== Licensing ==
GNU MCSim is free software; you can redistribute it and/or modify it under the terms of the GNU General Public License as published by the Free Software Foundation; either version 3, or any later version, at user option.

== Platform availability ==
The C source code is provided and can be compiled on any machine with a C compiler. The GNU Scientific Library must be available also on the target platform to use a few extra distributions in statistical models. To use the SBML translation abilities, the LibSBLM library should be installed. Starting with version 6.0.0, the Sundials Cvodes integrator is also used. To take advantage of parallel computation (from version 6.2.0 on) a Message Passing Interface (MPI) library must be installed.

== See also ==
- List of numerical analysis software
