= Kathleen Giacomini =

American geneticist

Kathleen M. Giacomini
- Education: University at Buffalo
- Honors: Scheele Award (2011)

Kathleen M. Giacomini is a professor of bioengineering and therapeutic sciences at the University of California, San Francisco. Her work focuses on how genetics affects the efficacy of drugs. She is also the co-director UCSF-Stanford Center of Excellence in Regulatory Sciences and Innovation for the department of Bioengineering at the University of California, San Francisco.

Giacomini has organized Health Care conferences in the San Francisco Bay Area

== Education ==
Giacomini earned her doctorate in pharmaceutics from the University at Buffalo. From 1979 to 81, Giacomini was a post-doctoral fellow in clinical pharmacology at Stanford University.

== Career ==
In 1998, Giacomini was named chair of the department of biopharmaceutical sciences at the University of California San Francisco. In 1999, Giacomini became the first woman honored as Pharmaceutical Scientist of the Year by the International Pharmaceutical Federation. In 2000, Giacomini organized the Pharmacogenomics of Membrane Transporters (PMT) Project at the University of California, San Francisco. In 2005, while serving as vice chair of the Pharmacogenetics Research Network, Giacomini was awarded the Paul Dawson Biotechnology Award by the American Association of Colleges of Pharmacy.

In 2010, Giacomini received the Therapeutic Frontiers Lecture Award from the American College of Clinical Pharmacy. The following year she was awarded the Scheele Award for her work on the pharmacogenetics of drug transporters. In 2014, Giacomini became the co-director UCSF-Stanford Center of Excellence in Regulatory Sciences and Innovation for the department of Bioengineering.

In 2018, Giacomini was awarded the Bill Heller Mentor of the Year Award by the American Foundation for Pharmaceutical Education and the Volwiler Research Award.
