= Planet Poker =

Defunct gambling website

- Website type: Gaming
- Founded: 1 January 1998
- Dissolved: 2017
- Founder: Randy Blumer
- Products: Poker games
- Website: Official website (2011 archive)
- Current status: Defunct

Planet Poker was an online poker platform and the first to offer real-money games. It operated from 1998 to 2017.

== History ==
=== The pioneer ===
Planet Poker was founded by Randy Blumer, who obtained the software license from ASF Software (later known as ConceptWorldwide). The software was developed by a team led by engineer Carl Anuszczyk. During the initial launch and testing phases in late 1997, Planet Poker started to build a customer base by placing advertisements in Card Player magazine. By the time the first real money table opened, a handful of customers were already ready to play.

On 1 January 1998, after several months of planning and preparation, Planet Poker dealt a $3–$6 game of Texas hold 'em poker. As days turned to weeks, the small group of customers began to grow and the poker games started to run longer. Sometime in February 1998, a game continued through the night with enough players rotating in and out the game that it carried all the way through to the next evening. Planet Poker keeping the game going was a big deal in online poker history, because it showed that playing for real cash online could actually work.

By the early summer of 1998, Planet Poker had amassed a following, and games regularly ran around the clock. Game selection was increased to meet the demand of the steady stream of new players. For the remainder of 1998, Planet Poker continued to grow, but as with any rapidly growing business, new challenges emerged. Credit card payments were accepted to allow customers an easy means of getting money into and out of the game. However, by far the largest challenges were technical in nature, and problems often required days to fully resolve. The Internet itself was in its infancy and was often plagued by geographic outages and poor connections. Nearly all the players were using dial-up Internet access.

Technical problems were further compounded by the growing demand for more features and enhancements. The site lacked many of the necessary playing features, and the backend capability did not adequately manage the cardroom. Planet Poker assembled an in-house team to address the backend issues, but the playing features were more of a challenge.

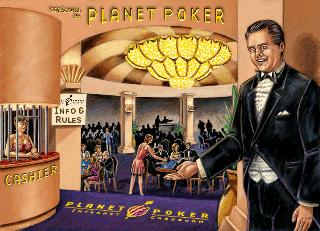
An early Planet Poker lobby

Implementation of new playing features required changes to the core game software and Planet had to rely on the third-party supplier to make them. Recognizing the importance of getting these features in place, agreements were renegotiated with the supplier that provided the software provider with generous payments to implement needed changes. However, the software supplier had mixed business interests, and the pace of developing the changes was less than required to keep pace with the evolving online poker industry. Maintaining a relationship with the software supplier soon became a time consuming effort that diverted resources from other aspects of the business.

=== Competition arrives ===
In 1999, a new cardroom called Paradise Poker emerged. Cn the week that Paradise Poker launched, Planet Poker was plagued with technical problems that led to several days of downtime. By the time Planet Poker recovered, Paradise had established a foothold, and the online poker industry got its first taste of competition.

Paradise Poker quickly gained popularity, and its customer base soon surpassed Planet’s, despite Planet’s growth continuing at a record pace. In a few short months, the number of concurrent players at peak times grew from 400 at Planet to 1500 at Planet and Paradise combined, with Paradise emerging as the clear industry leader with superior features and improved stability.

Planet Poker faced technical challenges compared to Paradise Poker. Planet focused on providing integrity and security for their customers. Mike Caro was engaged as a recognized figure in poker to guide and represent Planet Poker’s operation. The "mad genius of poker" contributed to the credibility to Planet Poker and the online poker industry as a whole. Roy Cooke also joined the Planet team, as the cardroom manager.

By early 2000, the capability gap between Planet Poker and Paradise Poker was continuing to widen. A new company, Acekicker.com Holdings Inc., was formed to develop software for Planet Poker. Based on Planet’s operational experience, a set of requirements was formulated that would allow Planet to re-capture the number one position in the industry. AceKicker’s initial efforts were plagued by issues with an offshore software developer, and the development of the software was delayed. By the time the issues were resolved and the development was moved to Canada, there were several new well-funded entrants in the online poker industry, and Planet was chasing a moving target. Most of Planet’s financial resources were diverted to software development. Planet now lacked the funding and expertise to compete with the industry giants in marketing. Planet would not launch its new system until 2004 and by this time, Party Poker dominated the industry, with a handful of rivals clustered near second place.

From 2002 onward, Planet Poker remained a steady fixture as the industry evolved. Many new poker rooms came and went. There was continuing explosive growth in the number of online poker players, but while Planet still retained a loyal customer base, it wasn't able to increase its critical mass to a point where it could compete with the larger sites. Although Planet Poker has maintained a loyal customer base, larger platforms have attracted more players. Planet Poker continued on as a small cardroom, with its friendly atmosphere as the primary attraction.

=== Legislation ===
In September 2006, the Unlawful Internet Gambling Enforcement Act (UIGEA) in the U.S. changed the legal landscape for the industry. By the time the act was passed, Planet Poker had registered over three quarters of a million customers.

In response to the UIGEA, however, Planet Poker suspended real money operations in March 2007. Planet Poker previously operated as a free play (subscription based) poker site through 2007–2017.

=== Ceasing Operations ===
After transitioning to a subscription-based free-to-play model in 2007, Planet Poker continued to operate for another ten years. However, as the online poker industry evolved and competition intensified, the platform ceased operations in 2017.
