= Roy Cooke =

American poker player and author

Roy Cooke is a professional poker player, poker consultant, and author living in Las Vegas, Nevada, USA. He was born in Atlanta, Georgia, on April 12, 1957. He spent his childhood in Derby (England) and Bellevue, Washington. Before taking up poker full-time, he attended the University of Washington where he majored in computer science.

Cooke has been a licensed real estate broker in Las Vegas since 1990. He is a member of the Summerlin chapter of Toastmasters, of which he was president in 2006. He is married to the former Francine Piano (Misty). They have one daughter, Krystle, born on August 16, 1992.

== Poker career ==
Cooke started playing poker in public cardrooms as a 15-year-old in Washington State in 1972. He took up the game full-time in 1975. Through the 1970s and early 1980s, he was a nomadic player — a "rounder" — traveling from town to town looking for games in Idaho, Montana, Washington, Oregon, Alaska and Reno, Nevada.

In 1984, Cooke moved to Las Vegas. He has played regularly with many WSOP champions including Johnny Moss, Berry Johnston, Tom McEvoy, Carlos Mortensen, Scotty Nguyen, Daniel Negreanu and Phil Hellmuth.

The game Cooke most frequently plays is Limit Texas Hold’em, although he forays somewhat regularly into No-Limit Hold’em. He has played almost 65,000 hours of poker live and online.

== Author ==
Since 1992, Cooke has, with his collaborator and co-author John Bond, written a poker column, "Real Poker", for Card Player magazine, where he is senior columnist. It is reputedly the longest continuously running poker feature in the world.

Books (co-authored with John Bond)
Real Poker: The Cooke Collection (MCU Press, 1999)
Real Poker II: The Play of Hands (1st edition MCU Press 2001)
Real Poker II: The Play of Hands (2nd edition ConJelCo Publishing 2005)
Cooke's Rules of Real Poker (ConJelCo Publishing, 2005)
The Home Poker Handbook (ConJelCo Publishing, 2007)
How to Think Like a Poker Pro (ConJelCo Publishing, 2008)
How to Play Like a Poker Pro (ConJelCo Publishing, 2008)

The forewords to Cooke and Bond's books have been written by major poker figures David Sklansky, Mike Caro, Linda Johnson, Mike Sexton, Daniel Negreanu, Chris Ferguson and Phil Gordon.

== Poker consulting ==
From 1999 to 2005, Cooke was the cardroom manager of the world's first real money Internet poker room, Planet Poker founded in 1998 by Randy Blumer of Victoria, British Columbia. Planet Poker turned to Cooke and fellow poker personality Mike Caro (known as The Mad Genius of Poker) to give the poker site credibility. While at Planet Poker, Cooke designed most of the protocols which are the foundation of the industry standard for protection against collusion.

Cooke has been a private consultant to a number of Internet poker sites and a featured speaker on marketing and anti-collusion protocols for poker sites at industry trade shows sponsored by River City Group, including the Global International Gaming Expo in Montreal (2005–2006).
