= The Journal of Clinical Pharmacology =

- Discipline: Pharmacology
- Language: English
- Edited by: Joseph S. Bertino, Jr.

Publication details
- History: 1961-present
- Publisher: John Wiley & Sons
- Frequency: Monthly

Standard abbreviations
- ISO 4: J. Clin. Pharmacol.

Indexing
- ISSN: 1552-4604
- OCLC no.: 1580982

Links
- Journal homepage; Early View Articles

The Journal of Clinical Pharmacology is a peer-reviewed medical journal that covers the field of pharmacology. The editor-in-chief is Joseph S. Bertino, Jr. (Bertino Consulting). It was established in 1961 and is currently published by John Wiley & Sons in association with the American College of Clinical Pharmacology.

== Title history ==
The journal was founded in 1961 as The Journal of New Drugs. It was known from 1967 to 1970 as The Journal of Clinical Pharmacology and the Journal of New Drugs and from 1970 to 1973 as The Journal of Clinical Pharmacology and New Drugs. In 1973 it obtained its present title.

== Abstracting and indexing ==
The Journal of Clinical Pharmacology is abstracted and indexed in the following bibliographic databases:

- Academic Search Premier
- Agricultural & Environmental Science Database
- BIOSIS
- Biotechnology Research Abstracts
- CAB Abstracts
- Chimica
- CINAHL
- EMBASE
- International Pharmaceutical Abstracts
- MEDLINE
- Science Citation Index Expanded
- Scopus
- Veterinary Science Database
