= Multi-compartment model =

Type of mathematical model

A multi-compartment model is a type of mathematical model used for describing the way materials or energies are transmitted among the compartments of a system. Often times, this is done when the physical system is too complex to model with a full equation, so it is much easier to discretize the problem and reduce the number of parameters. Each compartment is assumed to be a homogeneous entity within which the entities being modeled are equivalent. A multi-compartment model is classified as a lumped parameters model. Similar to more general mathematical models, multi-compartment models can treat variables as continuous, such as a differential equation, or as discrete, such as a Markov chain. Depending on the system being modeled, they can be treated as stochastic or deterministic.

Multi-compartment models are used in many fields including pharmacokinetics, epidemiology, biomedicine, systems theory, complexity theory, engineering, physics, information science and social science. The circuits systems can be viewed as a multi-compartment model as well. Most commonly, the mathematics of multi-compartment models is simplified to provide only a single parameter—such as concentration—within a compartment.

== In Systems Theory ==
In systems theory, it involves the description of a network whose components are compartments that represent a population of elements that are equivalent with respect to the manner in which they process input signals to the compartment.

- Instant homogeneous distribution of materials or energies within a "compartment."
- The exchange rate of materials or energies among the compartments is related to the densities of these compartments.
- Usually, it is desirable that the materials do not undergo chemical reactions while transmitting among the compartments.
- When concentration of the cell is of interest, typically the volume is assumed to be constant over time, though this may not be totally true in reality.

== Single-compartment model ==
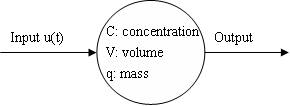

Possibly the simplest application of multi-compartment model is in the single-cell concentration monitoring (see the figure above). If the volume of a cell is V, the mass of solute is q, the input is u(t) and the secretion of the solution is proportional to the density of it within the cell, then the concentration of the solution C within the cell over time is given by

$$\frac{\mathrm{d}q}{\mathrm{d}t}=u(t)-kq$$

$$C=\frac{q}{V}$$

Where k is the proportionality.

== Software ==
Simulation Analysis and Modeling 2 SAAM II is a software system designed specifically to aid in the development and testing of multi-compartment models. It has a user-friendly graphical user interface wherein compartmental models are constructed by creating a visual representation of the model. From this model, the program automatically creates systems of ordinary differential equations. The program can both simulate and fit models to data, returning optimal parameter estimates and associated statistics. It was developed by scientists working on metabolism and hormones kinetics (e.g., glucose, lipids, or insulin). It was then used for tracer studies and pharmacokinetics. Albeit a multi-compartment model can in principle be developed and run via other software, like MATLAB or C++ languages, the user interface offered by SAAM II allows the modeler (and non-modelers) to better control the system, especially when the complexity increases.

== Discrete Compartmental Model ==
Discrete models are concerned with discrete variables, often a time interval $\Delta t$. An example of a discrete multi-compartmental model is a discrete version of the Lotka–Volterra Model. Here consider two compartments prey and predators denoted by $x(t)$ and $y(t)$ respectively. The compartments are coupled to each other by mass action terms in each equation. Over a discrete time-step $\Delta t$, we get

$$\begin{align}
x(t+\Delta t) &= x(t) + \alpha x(t)\Delta t - \beta x(t) y(t) \Delta t\\
y(t+\Delta t) &= y(t) +\delta x(t) y(t) \Delta t- \gamma y(t)\Delta t.
\end{align}$$

Here

- the $x(t)$ and $y(t)$ terms represent the number of that population at a given time $t$;
- the $\alpha x(t)\Delta t$ term represents the birth of prey;
- the mass action term $\beta x(t) y(t) \Delta t$ is the number of prey dying due to predators;
- the mass action term $\delta x(t) y(t) \Delta t$ represents the birth of predators as a function of prey eaten;
- the $\gamma y(t) \Delta t$ term is the death of predators;
- $\alpha, \beta, \delta,$ and $\gamma$ are real valued parameters determining the weights of each transitioning term.

These equations are easily solved iteratively.

== Continuous Compartmental Model ==
The discrete Lotka-Volterra example above can be turned into a continuous version by rearranging and taking the limit as $\Delta t \rightarrow 0$.

$$\begin{align}
&\lim_{\Delta t \rightarrow 0} \frac{x(t + \Delta t)-x(t)}{\Delta t} \equiv \frac{d x}{dt} = \alpha x - \beta x y\\
&\lim_{\Delta t \rightarrow 0}\frac{y(t + \Delta t)-y(t)}{\Delta t}\equiv \frac{d y}{dt} = \delta x y - \gamma y
\end{align}$$

This yields a system of ordinary differential equations. Treating this model as differential equations allows the implementation of calculus methods to study the dynamics of the system more in-depth.

== Multi-Compartment Model ==
As the number of compartments increases, the model can be very complex and the solutions usually beyond ordinary calculation.

The formulae for n-cell multi-compartment models become:

$$\begin{align}
\dot{q}_1=q_1 k_{11}+q_2 k_{12}+\cdots+q_n k_{1n}+u_1(t) \\
\dot{q}_2=q_1 k_{21}+q_2 k_{22}+\cdots+q_n k_{2n}+u_2(t) \\
\vdots\\
\dot{q}_n=q_1 k_{n1}+q_2 k_{n2}+\cdots+q_n k_{nn}+u_n(t)
\end{align}$$

Where

$0=\sum^n_{i=1}{k_{ij}}$ for $j=1,2,\dots,n$ (as the total 'contents' of all compartments is constant in a closed system)

Or in matrix forms:

$$\mathbf{\dot{q}}=\mathbf{Kq}+\mathbf{u}$$

Where

$$\mathbf{K}=\begin{bmatrix}
k_{11}& k_{12} &\cdots &k_{1n}\\
k_{21}& k_{22} & \cdots&k_{2n}\\
\vdots&\vdots&\ddots&\vdots \\
k_{n1}& k_{n2} &\cdots &k_{nn}\\
\end{bmatrix}
\mathbf{q}=\begin{bmatrix}
q_1 \\
q_2 \\
\vdots \\
q_n
\end{bmatrix}
\mathbf{u}=\begin{bmatrix}
u_1(t) \\
u_2(t) \\
\vdots \\
u_n(t)
\end{bmatrix}$$
and
$$\begin{bmatrix}
1 & 1 &\cdots & 1\\
\end{bmatrix}\mathbf{K}=\begin{bmatrix}
0 & 0 &\cdots & 0\\
\end{bmatrix}$$
(as the total 'contents' of all compartments is constant in a closed system)

In the special case of a closed system (see below) i.e. where $\mathbf{u}=0$ then there is a general solution.

$$\mathbf{q} = c_1 e^{\lambda_1 t} \mathbf{v_1} + c_2 e^{\lambda_2 t} \mathbf{v_2} + \cdots + c_n e^{\lambda_n t} \mathbf{v_n}$$

Where $\lambda_1$, $\lambda_2$, ... and $\lambda_n$ are the eigenvalues of $\mathbf{K}$; $\mathbf{v_1}$, $\mathbf{v_2}$, ... and $\mathbf{v_n}$ are the respective eigenvectors of $\mathbf{K}$; and $c_1$, $c_2$, .... and $c_n$ are constants.

However, it can be shown that given the above requirement to ensure the 'contents' of a closed system are constant, then for every pair of eigenvalue and eigenvector then either $\lambda=0$ or
$$\begin{bmatrix}
1 & 1 &\cdots & 1\\
\end{bmatrix}\mathbf{v}=0$$
and also that one eigenvalue is 0, say $\lambda_1$

So

$$\mathbf{q} = c_1  \mathbf{v_1} + c_2 e^{\lambda_2 t} \mathbf{v_2} + \cdots + c_n e^{\lambda_n t} \mathbf{v_n}$$

Where

$$\begin{bmatrix}
1 & 1 &\cdots & 1\\
\end{bmatrix}\mathbf{v_i}=0$$
for $\mathbf{i}=2, 3, \dots n$

This solution can be rearranged:

$$\mathbf{q} =
\Bigg[ \mathbf{v_1}\begin{bmatrix}
c_1 & 0 & \cdots & 0 \\
\end{bmatrix}
+ \mathbf{v_2}\begin{bmatrix}
0 & c_2 & \cdots & 0 \\
\end{bmatrix}
+ \dots + \mathbf{v_n}\begin{bmatrix}
0 & 0 & \cdots & c_n \\
\end{bmatrix} \Bigg]
\begin{bmatrix}
1 \\
e^{\lambda_2t} \\
\vdots \\
e^{\lambda_nt} \\
\end{bmatrix}$$

This somewhat inelegant equation demonstrates that all solutions of an n-cell multi-compartment model with constant or no inputs are of the form:

$$\mathbf{q} = \mathbf{A}
\begin{bmatrix}
1 \\
e^{\lambda_2t} \\
\vdots \\
e^{\lambda_nt} \\
\end{bmatrix}$$

Where $\mathbf{A}$ is a nxn matrix and $\lambda_2$, $\lambda_3$, ... and $\lambda_n$ are constants. Where
$$\begin{bmatrix}
1 & 1 &\cdots & 1\\
\end{bmatrix}\mathbf{A}=\begin{bmatrix}
a & 0 & \cdots & 0 \\
\end{bmatrix}$$

== Model topologies ==
Generally speaking, as the number of compartments increases, it is challenging both to find the algebraic and numerical solutions to the model. However, there are special cases of models, which rarely exist in nature, when the topologies exhibit certain regularities that the solutions become easier to find. The model can be classified according to the interconnection of cells and input/output characteristics:

1. Closed model: No sinks or source, lit. all k_{oi} = 0 and u_{i} = 0;
2. Open model: There are sinks or/and sources among cells.
3. Catenary model: All compartments are arranged in a chain, with each pool connecting only to its neighbors. This model has two or more cells.
4. Cyclic model: It's a special case of the catenary model, with three or more cells, in which the first and last cell are connected, i.e. k_{1n} ≠ 0 or/and k_{n1} ≠ 0.
5. Mammillary model: Consists of a central compartment with peripheral compartments connecting to it. There are no interconnections among other compartments.
6. Reducible model: It's a set of unconnected models. It bears great resemblance to the computer concept of forest as against trees.

== See also ==
- Mathematical model
- Biomedical engineering
- Biological neuron models
- Compartmental models in epidemiology
- Physiologically-based pharmacokinetic modelling
