= Roy Bird Cook =

American historian

Roy Bird Cook (April 1, 1886 – November 21, 1961) was a pharmacist and historian with a special interest in West Virginia history.

== Life ==
Cook was born in Lewis County, near Roanoke, West Virginia. He took a home study course in pharmacy during high school, and in 1905 took the State Board of Pharmacy exam to become the state's youngest certified pharmacist at the age of 19. He went on to practice pharmacy in Weston and Charleston, West Virginia.

He also maintained an active interest in the state's history. He helped found the West Virginia Historical Society, and wrote multiple books and articles on historical subjects.

== Works ==
- Collins Settlement of Old (191?)
- "Pioneer Sketches of Lewis County"; serialized in the Weston Independent, 1916–17.
- Alexander Scott Withers - Author of "Chronicles of Border Warfare" - A Sketch (1921), n.p.; unnumbered [but 15 pp].
- The Family and Early Life of Stonewall Jackson (1924), this work has been called "the first definitive study of Jackson's formative years,"
- Lewis County in the Civil War (1924)

== Awards ==
Cook received the Remington Honor Medal in 1955 from the American Pharmaceutical Association, and the Award of Merit from the West Virginia Library Association in 1957.

== Legacy ==
Cook collected a lot of material pertaining to the history of West Virginia, including the history of farming in the state, the history of the 31st Virginia Infantry, additional Civil War and early West Virginia state history, and more. He is responsible for multiple collections of materials held at the West Virginia & Regional History Center.
