= Takeru Higuchi =

American chemist

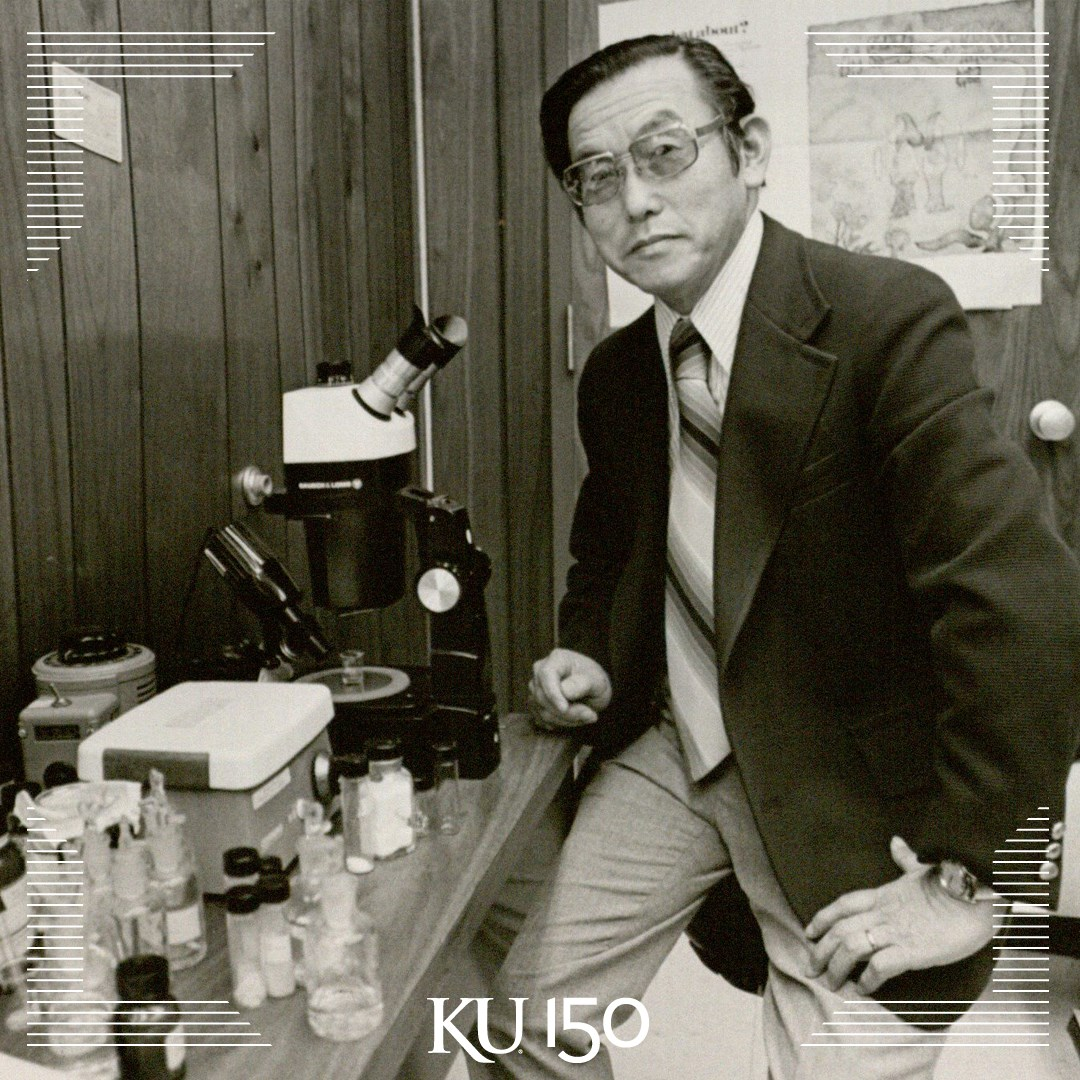
Takeru Higuchi, University of Kansas Distinguished Professor of Pharmacy and Chemistry

Takeru Higuchi (January 1, 1918 – March 24, 1987) was an American chemist who was widely known as "the father of physical pharmacy". He invented the time-release medication capsule, which would release medicine slowly into the bloodstream.

== Biography ==
Higuchi was born on January 1, 1918, near Los Altos, California, and completed his Bachelor of Chemistry with Honors in 1939 at the University of California and his doctorate in physical and organic chemistry in 1943 at the University of Wisconsin. He worked as a research chemist at the University of Akron, and in 1947 joined the University of Wisconsin as an assistant professor. In 1961, he published the Higuchi equation, which models the rate at which an ointment releases its medication. In 1964, he was made the university's Edward Kremmer Professor of Pharmacy.

In 1967 he joined the University of Kansas as its Regents Professor of Chemistry, and was founding chairman of the Department of Pharmaceutical Chemistry until 1983.

He died at the University of Missouri-Columbia Hospital and Clinics when was 69 years old.

== Awards and honors ==
Higuchi was widely honored, including:

- 1969 – awarded the Scheele Award
- 1981 – the American Pharmacists Association established the Takeru Higuchi Research Prize
- 1983 – awarded the Remington Medal
