= Simcyp =

Simcyp Limited
- Company type: Private
- Industry: Pharmacokinetic modelling & simulation
- Founded: Sheffield, UK (2001)
- Headquarters: Sheffield, United Kingdom
- Products: Simcyp Population-based ADME Simulator; Simcyp Paediatric; Simcyp Rat
- Website: https://www.certara.com

Simcyp Limited was acquired March 13, 2012, by Certara inc. Simcyp Limited is a research-based company which provides modelling and simulation software to the pharmaceutical industry for use during drug development. Simcyp is based in Sheffield, UK.

Simcyp's Simulators allow in silico prediction of drug absorption, distribution, metabolism excretion (ADME) and potential drug-drug interactions.

== Research and development ==
Simcyp's R&D activities focus on the development of algorithms along with population and drug databases for modelling and simulation (M&S) of the absorption and disposition of drugs in patients and specific subgroups of patients across different age ranges. The Simcyp models use experimental data generated routinely during pre-clinical drug discovery and development from in vitro enzyme and cellular systems, as well as any relevant physico-chemical attributes of the drug and dosage forms. Some details of the scientific background of Simcyp approaches can be found in recent publications.

== Background ==
Simcyp was originally formed as a spin-out company from the University of Sheffield, UK. The company operates the Simcyp Consortium of pharmaceutical and biotechnology companies. The Consortium acts as a steering committee, guiding scientific research and development at Simcyp. There is also close collaboration with regulatory bodies (the U.S. Food and Drug Administration, Swedish Medical Products Agency, NAM, ECVAM) and academic centres of excellence worldwide, within the framework of the Consortium.

== Simulator platforms ==
Simulator platforms include the Simcyp population-based ADME Simulator, Simcyp Paediatric, Simcyp Rat, Simcyp Dog, and Simcyp Mouse.

=== Simcyp Simulator ===
The Simcyp Simulator is a population-based ADME simulator is a modelling and simulation platform used by the pharmaceutical industry in drug discovery and development. The Simulator models drug absorption, distribution, metabolism and elimination using routinely generated in vitro data.

Simcyp simulations are performed in virtual populations, including paediatric populations, rather than an average individual. This allows individuals at extreme risk from adverse reactions to be identified before human studies. The functional capability of the Simcyp Simulator is summarized in the following table.

Metabolism	Identification of the extremes and determinants of population variability in in vivo drug metabolism from in vitro data generated using: Human liver microsomes Human intestinal microsomes Human kidney microsomes Human hepatocytes Recombinant CYP and UGT enzymes
PK profiles	Simulation of full drug and metabolite concentration–time profiles. Prediction of volume of distribution based on lipophilicity, ionisation, protein binding and tissue composition by reference to a 14 organ PBPK model
Drug – drug interactions	Prediction of the extent of metabolically-based drug–drug interactions, allowing simultaneous consideration of: Competitive enzyme inhibition Irreversible, mechanism (time)-based enzyme inhibition (including auto-inhibition); Enzyme-induction (including auto-induction); Multiple interactions (involving up to four drugs plus two metabolites) with complex study designs
Absorption	The Simcyp advanced dissolution absorption and metabolism (ADAM) model incorporates factors influencing the rate and extent of oral drug absorption including: Gastric emptying rate and intestinal and colon transit times Regio- and age-specific luminal pH as it affects ionisation, solubility, chemical stability, permeability, dissolution and precipitation GI tract surface area and regional variation in permeability and enzyme and transporter density Luminal fluid volumes and dynamics Fed versus fasting states It allows evaluation of immediate and modified release formulations and the impact of particle size on dissolution rate
Virtual patient populations	Simcyp population databases include North European Caucasians, Japanese, healthy volunteers (for virtual Phase I studies) as well as obese/morbidly obese individuals and patients with renal impairment (moderate or severe), and liver cirrhosis (Child-Pugh A, B or C)
Trial design	Flexible trial design options facilitate different routes of drug administration and a variety of dosing options including single/multiple dosing and dose staggering
Paediatric	A full PBPK model, supported by extensive libraries on demographics, developmental physiology and the ontogeny of drug elimination pathways allows prediction of PK behaviour in neonates, infants and children
