= Lewis B. Sheiner =

American pharmacometrician (1940–2004)

- Born: 1940; New York City
- Died: 2004 (Age 63)
- Education: Cornell University (BA); Albert Einstein College of Medicine (MD)
- Known for: Pharmacometrics; NONMEM
- Awards: Oscar B. Hunter Award (2004); Rawls Palmer Progress in Medicine Award (1989)

Lewis B. Sheiner (1940 – April 22, 2004) was an American pharmacologist, known for his seminal work developing and applying mathematical models to problems in pharmacodynamics and pharmacokinetics.

== Early life and education ==
Born in New York City in 1940, Lewis B. Sheiner received his Bachelor of Arts degree with Honors in Chemistry from Cornell University in 1960 and earned his Doctor of Medicine (M.D.) from the Albert Einstein College of Medicine in 1964.

== Career ==
After earning his M.D., Sheiner did a three-year stint at Columbia Presbyterian Medical Center, first as an intern and then as a resident. He then served as a Research Associate at the National Institutes of Mental Health and the NIH Division of Computer Research and Technology. Sheiner completed his medical residency training at Stanford University in 1970. A two-year Clinical Pharmacology Fellowship at the University of California, San Francisco (UCSF) lead to a faculty position starting in 1972. He remained at UCSF for the remainder of his career, where hist last title was Professor of Laboratory Medicine, Medicine and Biopharmaceutical Sciences.

== Research and contributions ==
Sheiner's research focused on developing mathematical models and data analysis techniques to quantitatively characterize the impact of drug therapy from observational data, gathered either during drug development trials or during routine patient care. The practical objective motivating his research was more efficient and informative clinical trials as well as the ability to optimize dosage recommendations for individual patients. His work has influenced clinical pharmacology as a scientific discipline as well as the pharmaceutical industry and drug regulation more broadly.

Sheiner's models have been implemented via software such as NONMEM, co-developed with Barr Rosenberg.

Among his many notable papers are "Modelling of individual pharmacokinetics for computer-aided drug dosage" in 1972, "Understanding the dose-effect relationship: clinical application of pharmacokinetic-pharmacodynamic models" co-written with Nick Holford in 1981, and "Learning versus confirming in clinical drug development" in 1997.

== Awards and honors ==
Sheiner received the Oscar B. Hunter Award, the highest honor of the American Society for Clinical Pharmacology and Therapeutics (ASCPT), in 2004. He was given an Honorary Doctorate from Uppsala University, Sweden in 1995 and received the Rawls Palmer Progress in Medicine Award of the ASCPT in 1989.

Posthumously, several awards have been named in Sheiner's honor, including the International Society of Pharmacometrics (ISoP) Lewis B. Sheiner Lecturer Award and the ASCPT's Sheiner-Beal Pharmacometrics Award.

== Death ==
Sheiner died on April 22, 2004, at the age of 63, after experiencing cardiac arrhythmias while traveling by train from a scientific workshop in Sils Maria, Switzerland.
