= Complex response =

A complex response refers to an environmental reaction to change that occurs at multiple levels to multiple objects, and can induce a chain reaction of responses to a single initial change. It is akin to the butterfly effect: one small event (change) can cascade through a given system creating new agents of change, and operating at several levels. The term is most commonly used in fluvial geomorphology, or the study of river systems and changes within those systems.

== See also ==
- complex system
