= Randy Blumer =

Canadian businessman (born 1958)

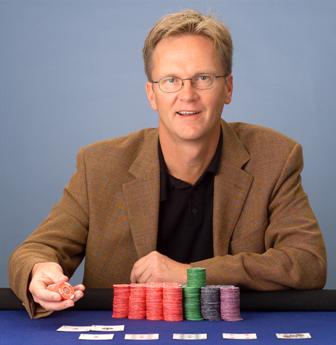
- Randy Blumer
- Born: October 21, 1958 (age 67); Edmonton, Alberta
- Occupation: Businessman

Randy Blumer (born October 21, 1958, in Edmonton, Alberta) is widely acknowledged as having started the multibillion-dollar online poker industry with the launch of Planet Poker, the world's first real money online poker room on January 1, 1998.

== Early life ==
Blumer was the younger of two boys. In 1970, the family moved to Europe when Randy’s father, Carl, got the opportunity to work as a school counselor on a 2-year exchange in Germany. Blumer started playing poker in Germany in Grade 6 while traveling on road trips with the peewee all-star hockey team frequently returning from trips with additional pocket money gained from playing poker.

He made his first trip to Las Vegas when he turned 21 and was exposed to a “new” form of poker (limit Texas hold 'em) in both cash game and tournament format. Upon his return to Edmonton he introduced the game to his poker playing buddies. Throughout his time at university, Blumer supplemented his student income by wagering in a variety of formats. Poker was his preferred pastime as it offered both an intellectual challenge and significant financial opportunity.

Blumer graduated from the University of Alberta with a Bachelor of Science Degree in Mechanical Engineering (1983) and found employment as a Marine Systems Engineer in the Canadian Navy. After graduating and finding employment, marriage became the next priority. Blumer married Beverly in Victoria BC on July 26, 1985.

His engineering background was used for the majority of his naval career working in Canada’s largest ever warship construction program. He achieved the rank of Lieutenant Commander before accepting an early retirement offer with the intent to make his fortune in online poker.

== Poker career ==
Blumer started Planet Poker in the summer of 1997. It became the first online real money cardroom when it converted from a free play site to a real money site on January 1, 1998. Mike Caro and Roy Cooke both joined the Planet team in 1999 to provide their expertise in promoting Planet Poker. He subsequently acted as a poker consultant to several other online casinos and cardrooms. His second-place finish in a field of over 6000 players in 2007 in the PokerStars million was his biggest poker payday to date. Despite all of his successes in the poker arena, Blumer is strictly an amateur player. He has played poker at various venues in England, Ireland, France, Canada, the US and the Caribbean.

Planet Poker has reverted to "play for fun" status in response to changes in the legal status regarding real money online poker introduced in 2006 by the United States. Blumer also launched Skillride.com in 2007, the internet's first play-for-fun, subscription-based poker site to fully comply with the Unlawful Internet Gambling Enforcement Act.

He and his wife Beverly have two children.
