= American College of Clinical Pharmacology =

- Abbreviation: ACCP
- Formation: 1969
- Headquarters: Ashburn, Virginia
- Website: www.accp1.org

The American College of Clinical Pharmacology® (ACCP) is a national organization of clinical pharmacology healthcare professionals who seek to advance clinical pharmacology.

== History and mission ==
In the 1960s, a group of physicians formulated the concept of an organization dedicated to a new branch of pharmacology that dealt with the effectiveness and safety of drugs in humans. As a result of their efforts, the American College of Clinical Pharmacology (ACCP) was founded on September 11, 1969.

The mission is to improve health by optimizing therapeutics and to provide leadership and education that enables the generation, integration and translation of scientific knowledge to optimize research, development and utilization of medication.

== Structure ==
ACCP is governed by a Board of Regents elected by ACCP Members. The Board is advised by a network of ACCP committees.

== Membership ==
Levels of membership in ACCP are Retired, Student, Member and Fellow (FCP). Fellowship is the organization's way of noting outstanding achievement in the discipline. Fellows require specific credentials and are recommended by their peers and reviewed by the Board of Regents.

== Publications ==
The Journal of Clinical Pharmacology, published by ACCP is the main journal of the College. Clinical Pharmacology in Drug Development is another publication.

== Activities ==
The College organizes a number of annual meetings and has several committees. There are special programs for students and to promote the discipline in developing countries.

== Education and information resources ==
ACCP promotes the rational use of medications in humans through research, development and regulation of medications, and education of healthcare professionals and patients on the optimal utilization of medications.

ACCP is jointly accredited by the Accreditation Council for Continuing Medical Education (ACCME), the Accreditation Council for Pharmacy Education (ACPE), and the American Nurses Credentialing Center (ANCC), to provide continuing education for the healthcare team.
