= Pharmacometrics =

Subdivision of pharmacology

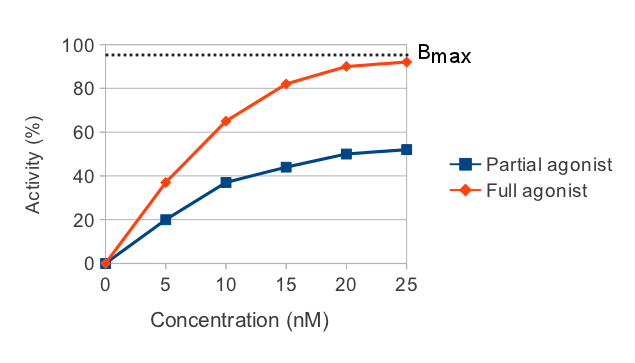
Agonists activating hypothetical enzymes.

Pharmacometrics is a field of study of the methodology and application of models for disease and pharmacological measurement. It uses mathematical models of biology, pharmacology, disease, and physiology to describe and quantify interactions between xenobiotics and patients (human and non-human), including beneficial effects and adverse effects. It is typically used to quantify drug, disease, and trial information to aid efficient drug development, regulatory decisions, and rational drug treatment in patients.

Pharmacometrics uses models based on pharmacology, physiology, and disease for quantitative analysis of interactions between drugs and patients. This involves Systems pharmacology, pharmacokinetics, pharmacodynamics and disease progression with a focus on populations and variability.

Mould and Upton provide an overview of basic concepts in population modeling, simulation, and model-based drug development.

A major focus of pharmacometrics is to understand variability in drug response. Variability may be predictable (e.g., due to differences in body weight or kidney function) or apparently unpredictable (reflecting the current knowledge gap).

== Origins ==
The term "pharmacometrics" first appeared in literature in the preface of the 1964 book "Evaluation of Drug Activities: Pharmacometrics":

The sub-title of the book is, as far as we are aware, a neologism, coined by one of us (A.L.B.), and the word is defined by the main title of the book, which could have been even more explicitly, if more verbosely, expressed as "The Identification and the Comparative Evaluation, Qualitative and Quantitative, of Drug Activities". The term has an etymological precedent in the now widely accepted "Econometrics". We hope it will prove useful for distinguishing the kind of measurement discussed and described in this book from what is nowadays called bioassay; although the same techniques sometimes serve for both, their objectives are not at all identical.

However, the editors later state at the end of the preface:

...we have learned with interest and humility that Dr. Karl Beyer, a vice-president of Merck, Sharpe and Dohme, Rahway, New Jersey, U.S.A., and current president of the American Pharmacological Society, "coined the word (Pharmacometrics) in the early '50s and has been using it in internal reports ever since" (J. R. Vane, personal communication). Moreover, one of the laboratories in the pharmacological department of his Company is "labeled 'Pharmacometrics'"!

We do not know in exactly what sense Dr. Beyer has been using the word, though we find it difficult to think of any other legitimate one than that advanced above. We can only hope that he also thinks so and that its use in the title of this book may help to give it the wider currency that we believe it to deserve and all the "priority" rights to Dr. Beyer.

== Types of models ==
=== Pharmacokinetics (PK) ===
Pharmacokinetic models.

=== Pharmacodynamics (PD) ===
Pharmacodynamic models.

=== Physiologically based Pharmacokinetics ===
Physiologically-Based Pharmacokinetic.

=== Exposure-response ===
Exposure-response models describe the relationship between exposure (or pharmacokinetics), and response (or pharmacodynamics) for both desired and undesired effects.

=== Disease progression ===
The natural time course of a disease is often dynamic, with the tendency to become worse without treatment. Disease progression models are mainly used to understand the relationship between treatment, biomarker changes and clinical outcomes. These models describe the disease trajectory, by observing the change in the biomarker level, or the other clinically relevant endpoint that reflects the disease status, over time. There are three key classes of disease progression models: empirical, semi-mechanistic, and systems biology. Most of the disease progression models are empirical, describing disease trajectory rather than the physiological background of the disease. The simplest model that is used to describe disease progression is a linear model when the change of disease status over time is assumed to be constant.

=== Trial ===
Trial models describe variations from the nominal trial protocol due to things such as patient dropout and lack of adherence to the dosing regimen.

== Organizations ==
Historically, pharmacometrics has been represented in related clinical pharmacology and statistics organizations. A number of smaller local organizations in Europe, the United States, and New Zealand/Australia held local meetings. In the early 1990s, the PAGE meeting was organized and has been held yearly since then, although no official organization was present. Ette and Williams have provided a historical context from which the evolution of pharmacometrics can be appreciated.

In 2011, the American Society of Pharmacometrics (ASoP) was founded by a number of local American groups, and over 600 members worldwide joined ASoP within 6 months. In 2012, ASoP evolved to the International Society of Pharmacometrics (ISoP) to reflect the increasing number of international members. ISoP's growth continues and the society currently represents over 1000 members from almost 30 countries around the world. Regional groups include PAGE in Europe and PAGANZ in Australia and New Zealand.

Pharmacometricians typically come from disciplines such as Pharmacy, Clinical pharmacology, Statistics, Medicine, or Engineering.

The first professor of pharmacometrics was Mats Karlsson, Uppsala University.

== Journals ==
The main journals that publish work in pharmacometrics are:

- AAPS J
- CPT: PSP
- CPT
- J PKPD
