= List of University of Iowa faculty =

The University of Iowa
- Type: Flagship; Public; Space grant
- Established: 1847
- Administrative staff: 2,296
- Location: Iowa City, Iowa, US
- Website: uiowa.edu

This list of University of Iowa faculty includes past and present instructors, researchers, and administrators at the University of Iowa.

== Administration ==
- Lena Hill interim chief diversity officer and associate vice president 2017–2018
- Carl Seashore dean of the graduate college 1908–37
- Dewey Stuit dean of the College of Arts from 1948 to 1977

== Humanities ==
- Timothy Barrett papermaker and paper-making researcher. 2009 MacArthur Fellow.
- Hans Breder artist, founder of the Intermedia department, served as Professor 1966–2000.
- Chunghi Choo (born 1938) jewelry designer and metalsmith
- Frank Conroy author, former head of Iowa Writers' Workshop
- Philip Greeley Clapp director of school of music 1919–53
- Linda Crist - Associate Emeritus Professor - labanotationist
- George De La Pena actor Associate Professor of Dance
- Robert Dick former visiting professor of flute 2002–03
- John Dilg (born 1945), artist and professor in the School of Art and Art History (1975–2017)
- Hualing Nieh Engle novelist, co-founder and former director of the International Writing Program.
- Paul Engle poet and director of the Iowa Writers' Workshop for 24 years. Engle also founded the International Writing Program.
- Carrie Figdor Associate Professor of Philosophy and philosopher of mind.
- Ed Folsom renowned Whitman scholar, Roy J. Carver Professor Emeritus of English. 2007 Guggenheim Fellow.
- Nicholas Johnson former FCC commissioner 1966–1973, U.S. Maritime Administrator. Professor, Department of Communication Studies and founding member of the Iowa Progressive Caucus.
- Douglas W. Jones electronic voting reform expert and cofounder of the Open Voting Consortium, Professor of Computer Science
- Tisch Jones, theatre arts and theatre history professor
- Mauricio Lasansky renowned printmaker, creator of The Nazi Drawings
- Michael Lewis-Beck Professor Emeritus, F. Wendell Miller Distinguished Professor of Political Science
- Erik Lie Associate Professor of Finance, Henry B. Tippie Research Fellow. Discovered the stock options backdating scandal
- Kembrew McLeod media activist and prankster
- Philip Roth 1960 National Book Award winning author of Goodbye, Columbus, taught creative writing
- Wiley B. Rutledge United States Supreme Court Justice; Dean of College of Law, 1935–1939
- Palagummi Sainath visiting instructor in International Programs. An award-winning Indian development journalist described as one of the world's greatest experts on famine and hunger.
- George Seifert former assistant football coach 1966, and former head coach of NFL San Francisco 49ers
- David G. Stern, professor of philosophy
- George D. Stoddard former chair of the Psychology Department, and former president of the University of Illinois
- Phil Stong Writing Instructor, author of the novel State Fair and others
- Bohumil Shimek naturalist and conservationist whom the Shimek State Forest is named after
- C. Vivian Stringer former women's basketball coach who is only coach in NCAA history to take three different teams to final four.
- Phebe Sudlow first female professor at the University of Iowa
- Basil Thompson former ballet master of the Joffrey Ballet and artistic director of the Milwaukee Ballet.
- James Van Allen physicist and discoverer of two radiation belts (the Van Allen Belts) that surround the Earth, Emeritus Carver Professor of Physics
- Kurt Vonnegut, Jr. American novelist and satirist, Iowa Writers' Workshop faculty 1965–66
- Himie Voxman alumnus, director of the School of Music from 1954–80
- Christine Whelan visiting assistant professor of Sociology, author of Why Smart Men Marry Smart Women
- Grant Wood American painter who painted American Gothic, instructor and director of WPA art projects

== Sciences ==
- Nancy C. Andreasen alumna and psychiatrist, 2000 National Medal of Science Recipient, Andrew H. Woods Chair of Psychiatry, Director of the Psychiatric Iowa Neuroimaging Consortium
- Kevin Campbell muscular dystrophy scientist, Investigator for the Howard Hughes Medical Institute and Professor and Head of Department of Molecular Physiology & Biophysics
- Samuel Calvin–(1840–1911) pioneering geologist.
- Zada Mary Cooper (1875–1961) - alumna and pharmacist - assistant, instructor, assistant professor, and associate professor. Founder of Kappa Epsilon and Rho Chi
- Antonio Damasio neurologist former M.W. Van Allen Professor and Head of Neurology 1989–2004, Director of USC Institute for the Neurological Study of Emotion and Creativity
- Albert Erives developmental geneticist
- Robert V. Hogg 1950 Ph.D. in mathematics and professor of Statistics from 1951–2001, former President of the American Statistical Association.
- Wendell Johnson (1904–1965) former head of the Department of Speech Pathology and Audiology; Pioneer in the field. See http://nicholasjohnson.org/wjohnson/
- Everett Franklin Lindquist developer of the ITBS and ACT exams.
- Nancy E. Goeken immunologist
- Donald Gurnett Physicist
- Charles F. Lynch Epidemiologist
- George Willard Martin noted mycologist. Head of the Department of Botany from 1953 to 1955.
- Ignacio Ponseti physician internationally known for non-surgical treatment of clubfoot
- J. Roger Porter chair Dept. of Microbiology 1949–1977, internationally known microbiologist
- David W. Murhammer Professor of Chemical and Biochemical Engineering
- Aliasger K. Salem Professor and Head of Division of Pharmaceutics and Translational Therapeutics, College of Pharmacy
- Ingo Titze University of Iowa Foundation Distinguished Professor, Department of Speech Pathology and Audiology and the School of Music; Executive Director of the National Center for Voice and Speech, centered at the Denver Center for the Performing Arts; father of vocology, a specialty within speech-language pathology; creator of Pavorobotti, a singing (voice simulation) robot featured on National Public Radio
- Lee Edward Travis alumnus, noted psychiatrist, Director of the university's first psychology clinic
- Asgar Zaheer, neuroscientist and retired Professor of Neurology at the University of Missouri at Columbia

== Sports ==
- Steve Alford men's head basketball coach 1999-2007
- Sam Barry former Iowa basketball coach (1922–1929), and Iowa baseball coach (1923–24) is only coach to have coached teams both to the Final Four and to the College World Series.
- Beth Beglin - head field hockey coach 1988-1999
- Francis X. Cretzmeyer - head men's and women's cross country and men's and women's track and field coach 1948-1977
- Forest Evashevski - head football coach 1952-1960
- Kirk Ferentz head football coach 1999–present
- Hayden Fry head football coach 1979-1998. Inducted into the College Football Hall of Fame
- Dan Gable - head wrestling coach 1976-1997
- Pops Harrison - head basketball coach 1942-1950
- Ralph Miller - head basketball coach 1964-1970
- Lute Olson head basketball coach 1974–1983
- Otto Vogel - head baseball coach 1925-1942; 1946-1966

== University of Iowa Presidents ==
Since 1855, 18 persons served as president of the University of Iowa plus 10 additional persons serving in an interim or acting capacity.

The 22nd and current president is Barbara J. Wilson, who has served since 2021.

For the full list, go to List of presidents of the University of Iowa.
