= University of Arizona College of Pharmacy =

Part of the University of Arizona

Coordinates: 32.238428°N 110.945475°W

- Type: Public
- Established: September, 1947
- Location: Tucson, Arizona
- Website: pharmacy.arizona.edu

College of Pharmacy is part of the University of Arizona, a public university in Tucson, Arizona, United States. It is the only pharmacy school at a public Arizona university and one of four health professions colleges at the Arizona Health Sciences Center campus. The college is accredited by the Accreditation Council for Pharmacy Education.

== History ==
In September 1947, the School of Pharmacy opened as part of the University of Arizona Liberal Arts College. Eighty-three students were enrolled. It became a full-fledged college in 1949, with 206 students and seven faculty members. Faculty and staff moved into new pharmacy building on the Arizona Health Sciences Center part of the campus in 1982. Faculty and students also have offices and classrooms in Roy P. Drachman Hall, next to the Pharmacy building. In 2007, the College of Pharmacy opened an office on the Phoenix Biomedical Campus.

=== Deans ===
- Rufus Lyman, MD, 1947–1950
- Haakon Bang, PhD, 1950–1952
- Willis R. Brewer, PhD, 1952–1975
- Albert L. Picchioni, PhD, 1975–1977
- Jack R. Cole, PhD, 1977–1989
- J. Lyle Bootman, PhD, ScD, 1987–2015
- Rick G. Schnellmann, PhD, 2016–2025

== Academic departments ==
=== Pharmacy Practice and Science ===
The Department of Pharmacy Practice and Science is responsible for providing instruction in how to be a pharmacist and teaches courses such as pharmacokinetics, patient assessment and quality improvement and medication error reduction. The Department of Pharmacy Practice and Science faculty oversee includes clinical studies and case overviews and experiential learning.

=== Pharmacology and Toxicology ===
The Department of Pharmacology and Toxicology is responsible for providing instruction in pharmacology, toxicology and medicinal chemistry to PharmD students and for providing graduate education to students in a variety of research tracks.

== Admissions ==
=== PharmD ===
The PharmD degree program is for students wishing to become pharmacists. The College of Pharmacy at the University of Arizona currently admits classes of 100 student pharmacists each fall semester. To qualify for admission to the PharmD program at the University of Arizona College of Pharmacy, an applicant for Fall admissions must complete 71 units/credits of specific pre-pharmacy courses. The Admissions Committee invites candidates to interview for admission to the college based upon the following criteria:

- a competitive science GPA
- PCAT score
- at least 50 hours of work or volunteer experience in a pharmacy setting
- three strong letters of recommendation
- community involvement

=== Graduate ===
Graduate degree programs (MS and PhD) are offered in pharmaceutical sciences and in pharmacology and toxicology. The specific tracks within the UA College of Pharmacy Graduate Studies Program do not accept applications for the spring semester admission. Applications are only accepted for fall semester admission. Applicants must meet the University of Arizona’s graduate admissions criteria.

== Class statistics ==
According to the Fall of 2016 data, the number of students in the PharmD program is 432 and there are 50 postgraduate students.

The majority of PharmD students come from Arizona (90% of the graduating Class of 2017). Enrollment is about 62% female and the average age is about 23 years old. The average science GPA for the Class of 2017 is 3.53 and average cumulative GPA is 3.59.

== Centers ==
=== Center for Toxicology ===
The center is the home for UA research and training toxicology programs at the university.

=== Southwest Environmental Health Sciences Center ===
The Southwest Environmental Health Sciences Center investigates mechanisms by which exposures to environmental agents (and other stresses) contribute to human disease.

=== Superfund Research Program ===
The UA Superfund Research Program is a collaborative research program among toxicologists, environmental scientists and environmental engineers from many University of Arizona colleges who address hazardous waste problems of the Southwest.

=== Center for Health Outcomes and PharmacoEconomic Research ===
The Center for Health Outcomes and PharmacoEconomic Research (HOPE) focuses on cost-effectiveness analysis of drug therapies, quality-of-life assessment, pharmaceutical policy analysis and drug-use evaluation

=== Arizona Poison and Drug Information Center ===
The Arizona Poison and Drug Information Center and the MotherToBaby Arizona at the College of Pharmacy answer about 60,000 hotline calls a year from the public and health-care professionals. About 70 percent of received calls are managed at home, keeping Arizonans out of emergency rooms and other facilities. The center also participates in research on anti-venom for snake bite, spider bite and scorpion stings.

=== Arizona Center for Drug Discovery ===
The Arizona Center for Drug Discovery was established in 2018. The center serves as an organizational hub connecting the University of Arizona researchers in Tucson and Phoenix with partnering organizations to advance academic-based drug discovery throughout the state. The Center is advised by a Scientific Advisory Board, a highly collaborative, interdisciplinary group who oversees all of the Center’s initiatives

== Student organizations ==
=== Prepharmacy ===
- Prepharmacy Club

=== PharmD ===
- American Association of Pharmaceutical Scientists (AAPS)
- Academy of Student Pharmacists (APhA-ASP)
- Arizona Pharmacy Association Student Pharmacy Academy (AzPA-SPA)
- Global Medical Brigades
- International Pharmaceutical Students Federation (IPSF)
- Kappa Epsilon
- Kappa Psi
- National Community Pharmacists Association (NCPA)
- PediaCats
- Phi Delta Chi-Alpha Nu Chapter
- Phi Lambda Sigma
- Rho Chi
- Student Society of Health-System Pharmacists (SSHP)
- Student Council

=== Graduate Organizations ===
- Graduate Student Council
- UA Graduate and Professional Student Council
- International Society for Pharmaeconomics and Outcomes Research (IPSOR)
