= Sandra Leal =

American pharmacist

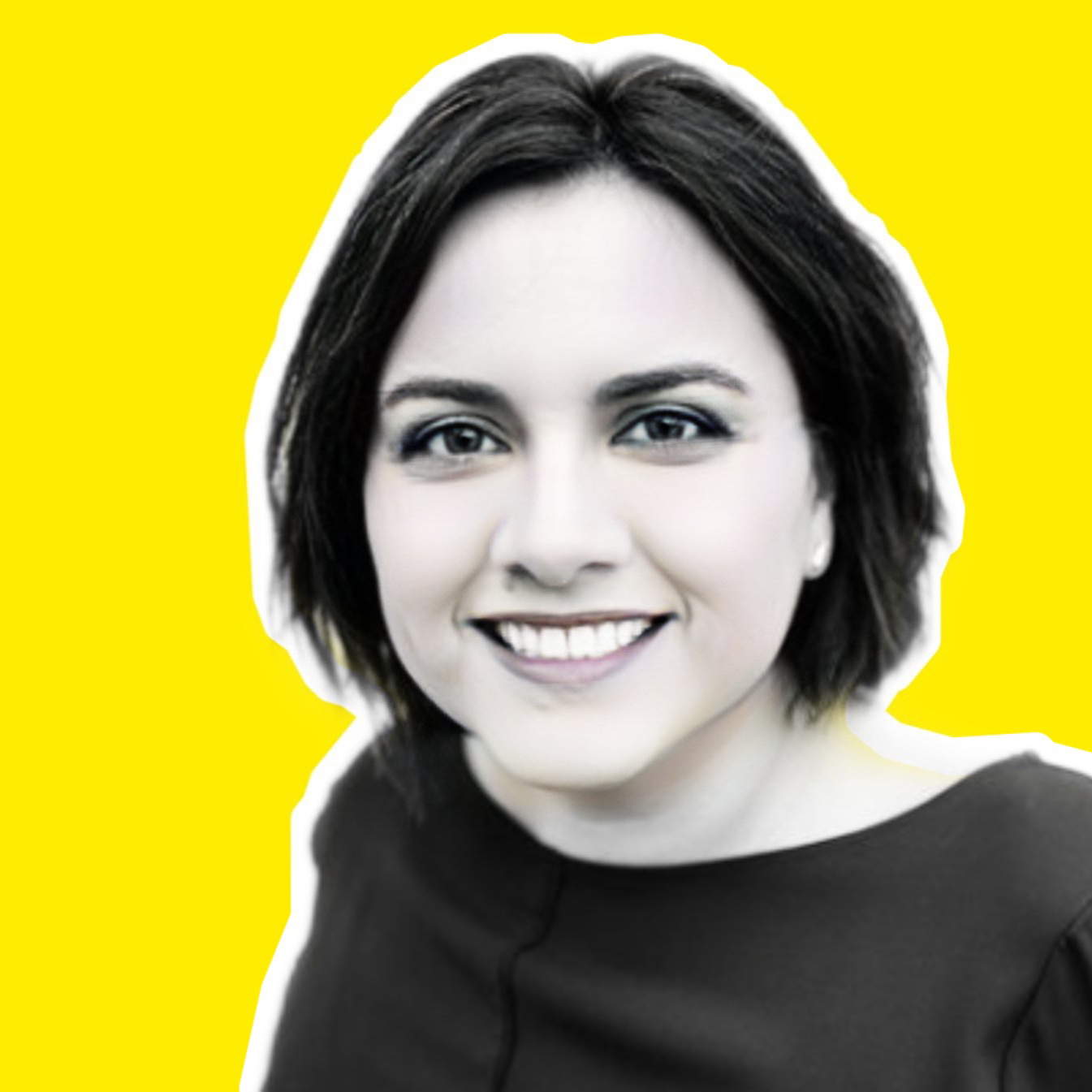
- Education: University of Arizona, University of Colorado, University of Massachusetts, Amherst
- Occupations: Pharmacist, healthcare executive
- Employer: CVS Health
- Office: President, American Pharmacists Association
- Term: 2020–2023

Sandra Leal is a pharmacist, a public health champion, an advocate, a healthcare executive, and the 166th President of the American Pharmacists Association.

== Early life and education ==
Leal grew up in Nogales, Arizona, and attended the University of Arizona before graduating from the University of Colorado's School of Pharmacy in 1999. She obtained a Master of Public Health from the University of Massachusetts, Amherst.

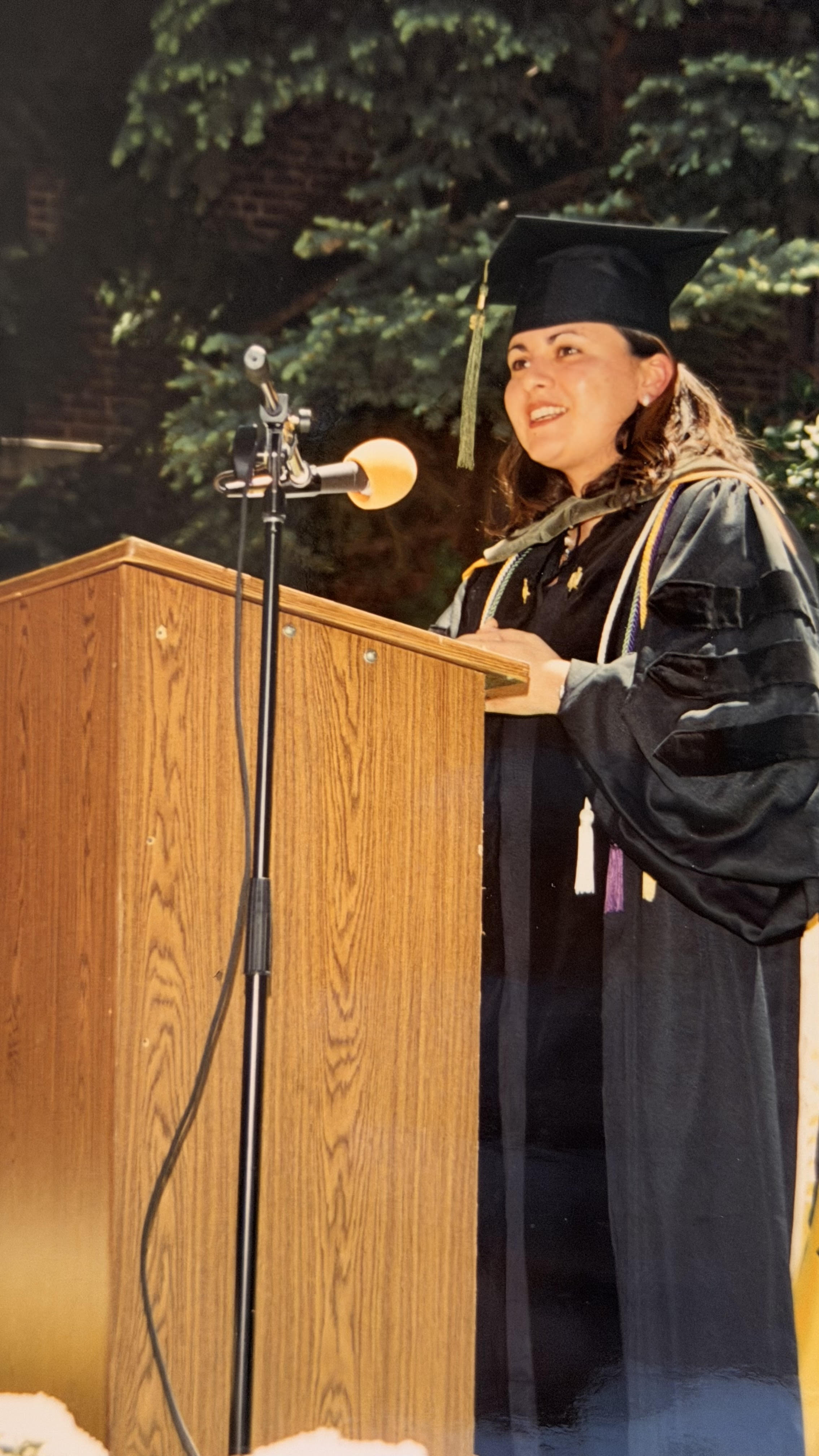
Commencement Address

== Career ==
She completed her residency at the Department of Veterans Affairs facility in Tucson, Arizona, and a fellowship with the Department of Health and Human Services. She has worked for as Medical Director and Director of Clinical Pharmacy Services for El Rio Health, a Federally Qualified Health Center. She has been Chief Executive Officer for SinfoníaRx, and an Executive Vice President for Tabula Rasa Healthcare. In 2021 she became the Vice President for Collaborative Innovation and Clinical Strategy for Aetna, a CVS Health Company. In 2022 she was became the Vice President for Pharmacy Practice Innovation for CVS Health. She then was Vice President for Pharmacy Advocacy and Regulatory Affairs until 2025. Most recently she is Vice President for Pharmacy Professional Relations for CVS Health.

Leal became the President of the American Pharmacists Association on March 15, 2021. She is only the 13th woman of 169 APhA presidents, the second Latina. Before that, she was the President for the Association of Clinicians for the Underserved and the National Center for Farmworker Health.

=== Professional service ===
Leal was the first pharmacist to prescribe under collaborative practice in the state of Arizona. She has been a Flu Fighter with the CDC.

=== Awards ===
Leal received the American Pharmacists Association Good Government Pharmacist of the Year Award in 2015. She was named Pharmacist of the Year in 2009 by the Arizona Pharmacy Association. She is a two time recipient of the American Pharmacists Association Foundation. She also received the American Society of Health-System Pharmacists Best Practice Award and the National Association of Community Health Centers Innovative Research in Primary Care Award. She is only the sixth honorary member of Kappa Epsilon.
