= Gireesh Gupchup =

American health researcher and academic

Gireesh V. Gupchup is a health services researcher, and educational administrator. He currently serves as Vice President for Academic Innovation, Planning and Partnerships for Southern Illinois University. He previously served as Dean and Professor of the SIUE School of Pharmacy. His area of research encompasses developing, and evaluating pharmacy and health care services in underserved populations.

== Education ==
Gupchup received his Bachelor of Pharmacy degree from the University of Mumbai (Bombay) in 1988. He then went on to receive a Master of Science in Industrial Pharmacy and a Master of Science in Administrative Pharmacy from the University of Toledo in 1990 and 1993, respectively. He completed his PHD from Purdue University in 1996. He completed the Academic Leadership Fellows Program in 2006-07 at the American Association of Colleges of Pharmacy. He was inducted as a Fellow of the American Pharmacists Association (FAPhA) in 2010.

== Career ==
Dr. Gupchup has been serving as Vice President for Academic Innovation, Planning and Partnerships for Southern Illinois University since June 2020. Prior to this, he was the Director for Community University Partnerships for Southern Illinois University Edwardsville from July 2018 until June 2020. Previously, Gupchup served as Dean of the Southern Illinois University Edwardsville School of Pharmacy from July 2010 until July 2018 (initially Acting Dean). Prior to this position he was Associate Dean for Student Affairs at SIUE School of Pharmacy. Earlier Gupchup was with the College of Pharmacy at the University of New Mexico Health Sciences Center (UNMHSC) where he was Associate Professor and Chair of the PharmacoEconomics, Pharmaceutical Policy and Outcomes Research (PEPPOR) Graduate Program and Director of the New Mexico Medicaid Retrospective Drug Utilization Review Program. He is a member of the Phi Kappa Phi National Honor Society, the Rho Chi National Pharmacy Honor Society and the Phi Lambda Sigma Pharmacy Leadership Society.

Examples of accomplishments under Gupchup's deanship include of the development of 15 affiliated residency programs, specializations in Education and Pediatrics within the PharmD degree, a PharmD/MBA concurrent degree, approval of a master's degree in Pharmaceutical Sciences, a Conditional Entry Program (CEP) for high school graduates, creation of the opportunity for PharmD students and alumni to obtain online Certificates in Organizational Leadership and/or Health Information Systems from Saint Louis University School of Professional Studies, several interprofessional educational offerings with the Schools of Dental Medicine and Nursing, and collaborations with JSS University, India and the University of Los Andes, Venezuela. The school houses the only NIH designated Center of Excellence in Pain Education (COePE) in the Midwest and received the first NIH R01 grant in the history of the university. Also, in 2011 the school became the first School/College of Pharmacy (and remains the only pharmacy school/college) to receive the Council for Higher Education Accreditation (CHEA) Award for Outstanding Institutional Practices in Student Learning Outcomes.

== Service ==
Gupchup has served as a site visitor for ACPE several times. Gupchup has served on the Pharmacy College Application Service (PharmCAS) National Advisory Board and on the Leadership Board for the American Lung Association of Illinois. Gupchup serves on the Board of Studies of the South Indian Education Society College of Management Studies (SIESCOMS). Also, he serves on the St. Louis Regional Chamber Health Economy Forum, a group of senior executives in the St. Louis Metro area that is working to implement a vision for the future of the regional health care sector. Beginning in January 2016 he serves on the Greater St. Louis United Way Auxiliary Board for Southwestern Illinois.
