= Lyman F. Kebler =

American chemist, physician and writer (1863-1955)

Lyman Frederick Kebler
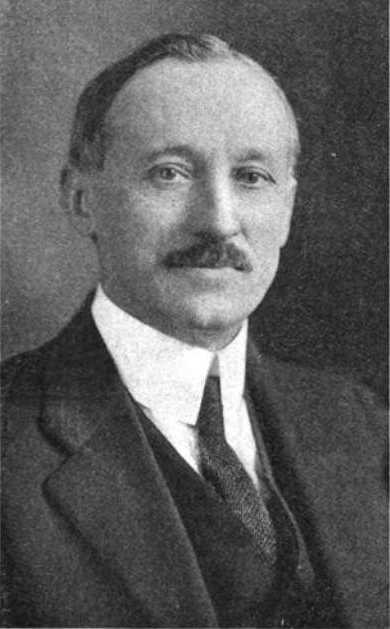
- Born: June 8, 1863; Lodi Township, Michigan
- Died: March 4, 1955 (aged 91); Suitland, Maryland
- Occupations: Chemist, writer

Lyman Frederick Kebler (June 8, 1863 – March 4, 1955) was an American chemist, physician and writer.

== Biography ==
Kebler was born in Lodi Township, Michigan. He was educated at the University of Michigan College of Pharmacy. He studied chemistry and obtained his bachelor´s degree in 1891 and his master's degree a year later. He joined the American Public Health Association in 1894. Kebler was the Chief chemist at Smith, Kline & French Laboratory, where he became an expert on drug adulteration. In 1903, he became the first Director of the Drug Laboratory, Bureau of Chemistry, in the Department of Agriculture.

Kebler married Isa E. Shaw in 1893. He taught chemistry at Iowa Agricultural College (1888-1889) and was an Instructor in Chemistry (1901-1902) at University of Michigan. In 1906, he received his M.D. from George Washington University at the age of 43. Kebler administrated the Pure Food and Drug Act of 1906. He was involved with uncovering counterfeit drugs. His office managed all chemists whose task was to determine the boundary between drugs and food, for which different criteria were enforced. By 1908 the Drug Laboratory was divided into four laboratories and was renamed the Drug Division. Kebler became Director of the Drug Division. He served as a special adviser to the Post Office Department on medical schemes. He was a past president of University of Michigan Club of Washington.

In 1927, the Bureau of Chemistry became the United States Food, Drug and Insecticide Administration and in 1930 the U.S. Food and Drug Administration. Kebler became known as a "foe to fakers” for his research on exposing fraudulent medical schemes.

== Selected publications ==
- Adulterated Drugs and Chemicals (1904)
- Kebler, L. F. (1906). Nostrums and Fraudulent Methods of Exploitation. Journal of the American Medical Association 47: 1546-1550, 1623-1630.
- Drug legislation in the United States (1909)
- The Harmful Effects of Acetanilid, Antipyrin, and Phenacetin (1909)
- Habit-Forming Agents (1910)
- The Tablet Industry, Its Evolution and Present Status (1913)
- Eat and Keep Fit (1935)
- Kebler, L. F. (1940). Establishment of the Drug Laboratory in the Bureau of Chemistry, United States Department of Agriculture. Journal of the American Pharmaceutical Association 29: 380.

== See also ==
- Arthur J. Cramp
