= Timothy Tucker =

American pharmacist

Dr. Timothy Tucker is a former pharmacist in Huntingdon, Tennessee, and former president of the American Pharmacists Association. He is a Former Speaker of the American Pharmacists Association House of Delegates and has testified before the United States House of Representatives Government Reform Committee on implementing Medicare Part D, and spoken before the United States Senate Finance Committee regarding community pharmacy contract negotiations .

Tucker is also a past national president of Phi Lambda Sigma, and served as co-chair of the State of Tennessee TennCare Centers of Excellence Board of Directors. Tucker is President of Tucker & Roe, Inc., which is a long-term care consultanting firm. He is also former President of the Tennessee Pharmacists Association and former President of the Tennessee Board of Pharmacy.

In addition, Tucker is currently serving a second term on the American Pharmacists Association Board of Trustees.

Tucker is also a member of Lambda Chi Alpha Lambda-Zeta Zeta at Union University.

== Education ==
- Union University
