= Mary V. Relling =

American pharmacogeneticist

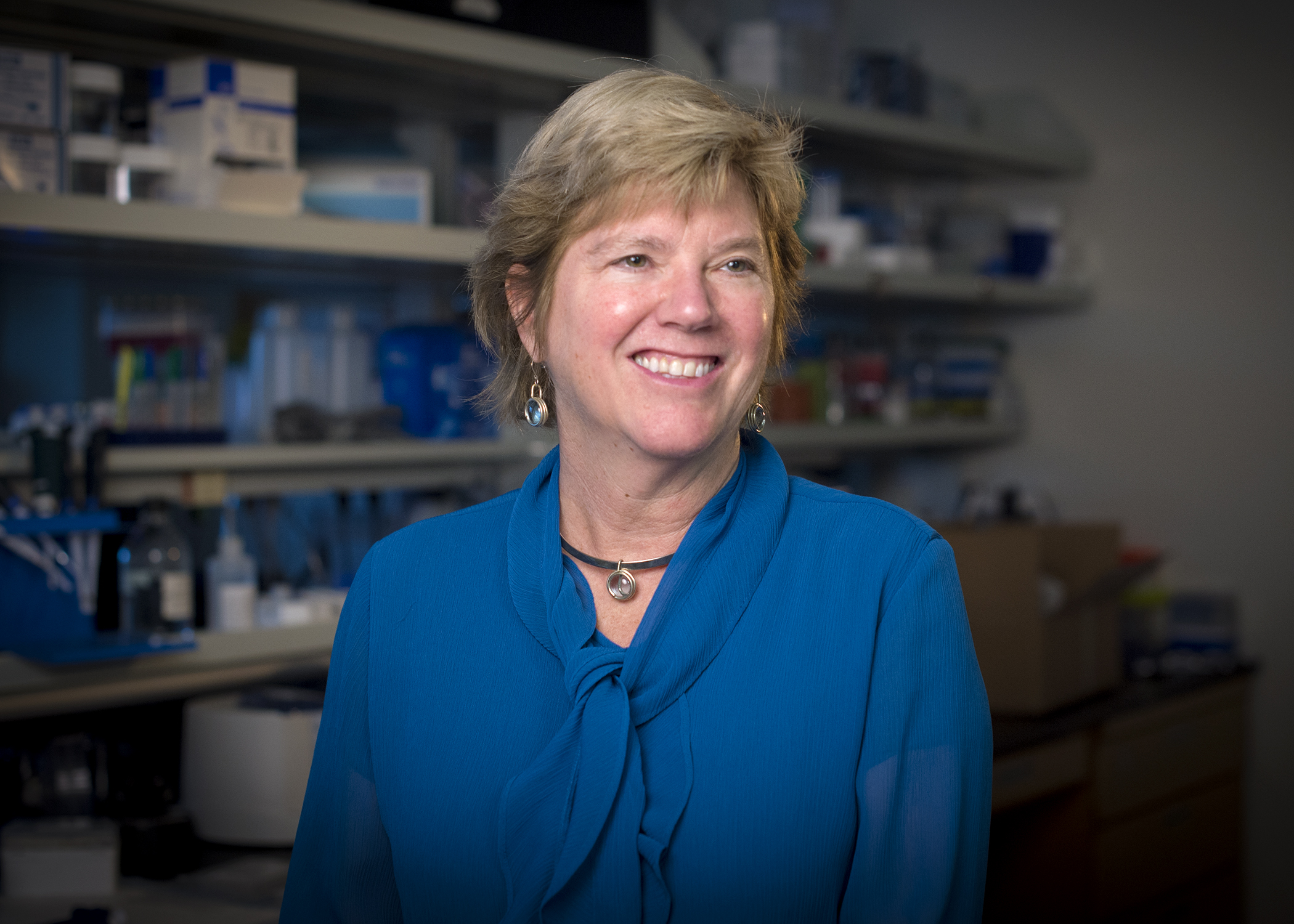
- Relling in 2018

Academic background
- Education: BS, University of Arizona College of Pharmacy; PharmD, University of Utah College of Pharmacy

Academic work
- Institutions: St. Jude Children's Research Hospital; University of Tennessee

Mary Violet Relling is an American pharmacogeneticist. Relling's research focuses on pharmacokinetics and pharmacodynamics in children and how genome variability influences a child's response to cancer chemotherapy.

== Early life and education ==
Relling completed her Bachelor of Science degree at the University of Arizona College of Pharmacy and her PharmD at the University of Utah College of Pharmacy.

== Career ==
Upon completing her PharmD, Relling joined St. Jude Children's Research Hospital as a faculty member in 1988. She also accepted a professorship position at the University of Tennessee in clinical pharmacy and pharmaceutical sciences. In her research, she focused on antineoplastic PK and PD in children, pharmacogenetics of antileukemia therapy and host- and treatment-related risk factors for secondary malignancies. In 2007, while serving as Chair of the Pharmaceutical Department, Relling led a study on the impact of inherited polymorphisms on patients with acute lymphoblastic leukaemia. The aim of the study was to see if this knowledge could allow individual tailoring of therapy.

While serving as Chair of the Pharmaceutical Department at St. Jude Children's Research Hospital, Relling focused on improving drug therapy for childhood leukaemia. In recognition of her research, she was the co-recipient of the 2009 Paediatric Oncology Award from the American Society of Clinical Oncology. Later that year, she led the first genomewide association study to check for genetic variations linked to acute lymphoblastic leukemia. Relling also co-established The Clinical Pharmacogenetics Implementation Consortium (CPIC) to "provide freely available, evidence‐based, peer‐reviewed, and updated pharmacogenetic clinical practice guidelines." As a result of her research, Relling was elected to the National Academy of Medicine in 2009 alongside colleague Michael B. Kastan. The following year, Relling was the senior author of the "first genome-wide study to demonstrate an inherited genetic basis for racial and ethnic disparities in cancer survival linked Native American ancestry with an increased risk of relapse in young leukemia patients." She was also the recipient of the Sumner J. Yaffe Lifetime Award in Pediatric Pharmacology and Therapeutics and Award for Clinical Service from the Institute for Pharmacogenomics and Individualized Therapy at the University of North Carolina at Chapel Hill. In 2013, Relling was the recipient of the Rawls-Palmer Progress in Medicine Award for her "efforts of modern research in patient care and to help bridge the gap between the results of research and its application in patient care." The following year, she was the recipient of the Rigshospitalet's International KFJ Award for "her work to improve treatment for children suffering from leukaemia using customised medication."

While serving with the National Institutes of Health Pharmacogenomics Research Network (PGRN), Relling received a grant to develop better ways to predict how patients will respond to the drugs they're given. She also helped identify a rare genetic variation associated with a dramatically increased risk of severe acute pancreatitis in acute lymphoblastic leukemia patients treated with the chemotherapy agent asparaginase. During the COVID-19 pandemic, Relling stepped down as chair of the Department of Pharmaceutical Sciences at St. Jude Children's Research Hospital. She later collaborated with Jun J. Yang investigating the inherited genetics of childhood leukemia and how particular gene variations can affect treatment outcomes. Near the conclusion of 2020, Relling was named to the 2020 list of Highly Cited Researchers.
