= Roger Porter =

Roger Porter may refer to:

- Roger B. Porter (born 1946), American professor of business and government
- J. Roger Porter (1909–1979), microbiologist
