= Orientations of Proteins in Membranes database =

Database of protein structures

Orientations of Proteins in Membranes
Content
- Description: The database provides spatial arrangement of proteins in the lipid bilayer
- Data types captured: Protein structures from the PDB
- Organisms: All

Contact
- Research center: University of Michigan College of Pharmacy
- Primary citation: PMID 16397007
- Release date: 2005

Access
- Data format: modified PDB format
- Website: https://opm.phar.umich.edu
- Download URL: OPM files

Tools
- Web: Server for calculating positions of proteins in membranes

Miscellaneous
- License: CC-BY 3.0
- Version: 2.0
- Curation policy: Curated

Orientations of Proteins in Membranes (OPM) database provides spatial positions of membrane protein structures with respect to the lipid bilayer. Positions of the proteins are calculated using an implicit solvation model of the lipid bilayer. The results of calculations were verified against experimental studies of spatial arrangement of transmembrane and peripheral proteins in membranes.

Proteins structures are taken from the Protein Data Bank. OPM also provides structural classification of membrane-associated proteins into families and superfamilies, membrane topology, quaternary structure of proteins in membrane-bound state, and the type of a destination membrane for each protein. The coordinate files with calculated membrane boundaries are downloadable. The site allows visualization of protein structures with membrane boundary planes through Jmol.

The database was widely used in experimental and theoretical studies of membrane-associated proteins. However, structures of many membrane-associated proteins are not included in the database if their spatial arrangement in membrane cannot be computationally predicted from the three-dimensional structure. This is the case when all membrane-anchoring parts of the proteins (amphiphilic alpha helices, exposed nonpolar residues, or lipidated amino acid residues) are missing in the experimental structures. The database also does not include lower resolution structures with only main chain atoms provided by the Protein Data Bank. The calculated spatial arrangements of the lower resolution protein structures in the lipid bilayer can be found in other resources, such as PDBTM.
