= Charles Rudolph Walgreen Jr. =

American businessman (1906–2007)

- Born: March 4, 1906; Chicago, Illinois, US
- Died: February 10, 2007 (aged 100); Northfield, Illinois, US
- Education: University of Michigan
- Occupations: Former President of Walgreens (1939–1963); Chairman of the Board (1963–1976)
- Spouse(s): Mary Ann Leslie (1933–1983); Jean B. Walgreen (1983–2007)
- Children: 3, including Charles R. Walgreen III
- Father: Charles Rudolph Walgreen

Charles Rudolph Walgreen Jr. (March 4, 1906 – February 10, 2007) was an American businessman who was the president of Walgreens from 1939 until 1963 and the chairman of the board from 1963 until 1976.

== Biography ==
He was born on March 4, 1906, in Chicago, Illinois, to Charles Rudolph Walgreen and Myrtle Norton. He attended the University of Michigan College of Pharmacy and was a member of Tau Kappa Epsilon.

Walgreen Jr. started out as a buyer for the company. As head of the company he increased the profit and size of the drug store, encouraged new lines of products to be sold and changed the format from counter service to self-service. He relinquished his role in company in 1969 to his son Charles R. Walgreen III.

He died in 2007 at age 100.

== Legacy ==
Shortly before his death, Walgreen donated $10 million to the University of Michigan and that gift proved to be instrumental in the building of the Walgreen Drama Center located on the University of Michigan's North Campus in Ann Arbor.
