= Journal of Pharmaceutical Sciences =

- Discipline: Pharmacy
- Language: English
- Edited by: Kenneth L. Audus

Publication details
- Former name: Journal of the American Pharmaceutical Association
- History: 1912-present
- Publisher: Elsevier on behalf of the American Pharmacists Association (United States)
- Frequency: Monthly
- Impact factor: 3.8 (2024)

Standard abbreviations
- ISO 4: J. Pharm. Sci.

Indexing
- ISSN: 1520-6017 (print); 0022-3549 (web)
- OCLC no.: 01754726

Links
- Journal homepage

The Journal of Pharmaceutical Sciences is a monthly peer-reviewed scientific journal published by Elsevier on behalf of the American Pharmacists Association, with the support of the International Pharmaceutical Federation. It is also published simultaneously by Wiley. It deals with the science of pharmacology and related biotechnology (the official journal of the association, dealing with the practice of pharmacy, is the Journal of the American Pharmacists Association)

The journal was first published in 1912, as The Journal of the American Pharmaceutical Association, which covered both general and scientific topics. It was published as a separate edition, Journal of the American Pharmaceutical Association (Scientific ed.) from 1940 to 1960. It adopted its present title in 1961. The editor-in-chief is Kenneth L. Audus (University of Kansas).

According to the Journal Citation Reports the journal has a 2024 impact factor of 3.8, ranking it 92nd out of 352 journals in the category "Pharmacology & Pharmacy.
