= Albert Benjamin Prescott =

American chemist (1832–1905)

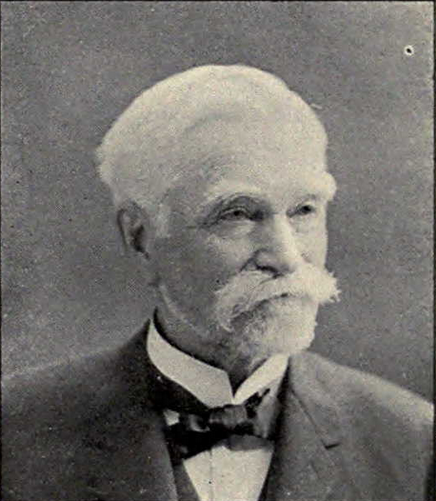
Albert Benjamin Prescott, 1896

Albert Benjamin Prescott (December 12, 1832, Hastings, New York – February 25, 1905) was an American chemist. He graduated in medicine at the University of Michigan in 1864, and was made assistant professor of organic and applied chemistry, dean of the school of pharmacy, and director of the chemical laboratory over the years. Professor Prescott served as president of the American Chemical Society in 1886, president of the American Association for the Advancement of Science in 1891, and president of the American Pharmacists Association in 1900. During his tenure as Dean at the University of Michigan College of Pharmacy, Prescott encouraged the foundation of what is now the Phi Delta Chi professional pharmacy fraternity. He is buried with his wife and children at Forest Hill Cemetery, adjacent to the University of Michigan Central Campus.

== Early life ==
Professor Prescott was born on December 12, 1832, in Hasting, New York. He was the youngest of four children in Benjamin Prescott and Experience Huntley Prescott's household. His ancestor John Prescott migrated from England to Boston in 1640. William Hickling Prescott, the prominent historian, and Colonel William Prescott, the commander in the battle of Bunker Hill, were also of the same lineage as Albert Prescott. With so many influential figures in his family, Prescott undoubtedly showed a desire to succeed at an early age. Unfortunately, at the age of nine, he suffered a critical injury to his right knee from a major fall that crippled him for life. His mother's opposition to amputate the leg prevented further complication but the injury made his stay indoor for about five years. That was the “seed-time of his future.” During those years, he developed an interest in literature and writing. He read a vast collection of books from the district circulating library at his home and wrote short reviews and storied on them. Under the guidance of his sister and private tutors, he gained knowledge of Latin, French, German and various branches of science. His father, Benjamin Prescott, died in 1848 leaving his oldest son in charge of the household. Sixteen-year-old Prescott decided to join his older brother to work on the farm for next three years while continuing his education. At that time, he joined the anti-slavery protest by becoming a correspondent of a paper called The Liberator. He further worked as a correspondent for the New York Tribune in 1853.

== Education ==
While working as a correspondent, he continued his education under private instruction. He enjoyed history, literature, and writing but found his true passion for science and analytical works. He decided to pursue a career in medicine and began to prepare himself to get into a medical school. He taught in the neighborhood school while preparing for admission. In 1857, he started to work for a well-known physician named Dr. Greenleaf from Brewerton, N. Y. Dr. Greenleaf was his mentor for three years until he entered the department of Medicine and Surgery at the University of Michigan in 1860, graduating with a degree in Doctor of Medicine in 1864.

== Early career ==
Following graduation in 1864, Dr. Prescott joined the Union Army and was appointed as an Assistant Surgeon in Totten Hospital of Louisville, Kentucky after passing the medical service examination in the United States Army. Later in the war, he became a member of the Medical Board of Examiners and Chief Surgeon of Foundry Hospital in Louisville. A few months later, he was appointed to be the Chief Surgeon of the Jefferson General Hospital in nearby Port Fulton. In 1865, he was dismissed from the army with a rank of Brevet Captain. After leaving the army, Dr. Prescott took the offer to be an assistant professor of Chemistry and Lecturer of Organic Chemistry and Metallurgy at the University of Michigan. In 1868, he was in charge of the newly formed School of Pharmacy. Just two years after that, he was promoted to be a professor of Organic and Applied Chemistry and Pharmacy. In 1879, he became the dean of the School of Pharmacy and in 1884, the director of the Chemical Laboratory. He was elected to the American Philosophical Society in 1898.

== Contribution to the pharmaceutical education ==
Revolutionary changes in the curriculum of pharmaceutical education were one of Dr. Prescott's biggest accomplishments. Throughout the nineteenth century, a prerequisite for the higher level pharmaceutical study was based mostly on apprenticeship programs where pharmacists learned on a practical basis. According to professor Edward Parrish, member of the Philadelphia College of Pharmacy, the goal of the apprenticeship programs were to give students a pre-professional experience and prepare them for admission to courses offered by colleges. However, there were no legal requirements for preparatory training in high school prior to the enrollment in an apprenticeship program. So College of Pharmacy continued to enroll students that were experts on memorizing drug names and doing hands-on work but lacked in fundamental knowledge of basic science. Once Dr. Prescott gained responsibility of the School of Pharmacy in University of Michigan, he took quite an innovative step by launching a program that not only offered extensive laboratory experience in basic science but also eliminated the requirement for apprenticeship for the first time in history. Many including, the editor of American Journal of Pharmacy, William Procter were skeptical about the merit of the diploma offered at the university due to such non-traditional course requirements. Dr. Prescott was even denied to be a delegate to the American Pharmaceutical Association (APhA) meeting in 1871. According to the clause of byLaws of APhA, “All colleges of Pharmacy or local Pharmaceutical Organizations shall be entitled to five representatives” but the University of Michigan did not fall under the definition of School of Pharmacy or Pharmaceutical Organization due to its different curriculum. Following the report of APhA, Dr. Prescott presented his response saying that apprenticeship was not the best way to teach students since it ignored the nature of materials the students deal with. He further supported his argument by saying that “the pharmacist that trained the apprentice was also a recipient of a non-scientifically oriented apprenticeship” so there was no net advancement in actual pharmaceutical knowledge. Besides advocating for laboratory-based pharmaceutical education, he promoted preparatory courses prior to college enrollment. He made “three years' schooling in Latin and German, algebra through quadratic equations, botany, and elementary physics, besides arithmetic through involution and evolution, and the correct writing of English” a requirement for the University of Michigan prior to enrollment to ensure proper understanding for the higher-level courses. Dr. Prescott's innovative steps might not have been welcomed at first but eventually, educators and leaders in charge of pharmaceutical education realized the importance of his acts and adapted to the new changes.

== Legacy and memorials ==
Prescott House, located within the East Quadrangle dormitory on the University of Michigan's Central Campus, was named in his honor. Additionally, an early student organization associated with the College of Pharmacy was called Prescott Club.

== Books ==
- Qualitative Chemical Analysis (1874; fifth edition, 1901)
- Chemistry of Alcoholic Liquors (1875)
- Outlines of Proximate Organic Analysis (1875; second edition, 1877)
- First Book in Qualitative Chemistry (1879; eleventh edition, 1902)
- Organic Analysis (1887; second edition, 1889)
