= American Institute of Pharmacy Building =

Building in Washington, D.C.

- U.S. National Register of Historic Places
- D.C. Inventory of Historic Sites
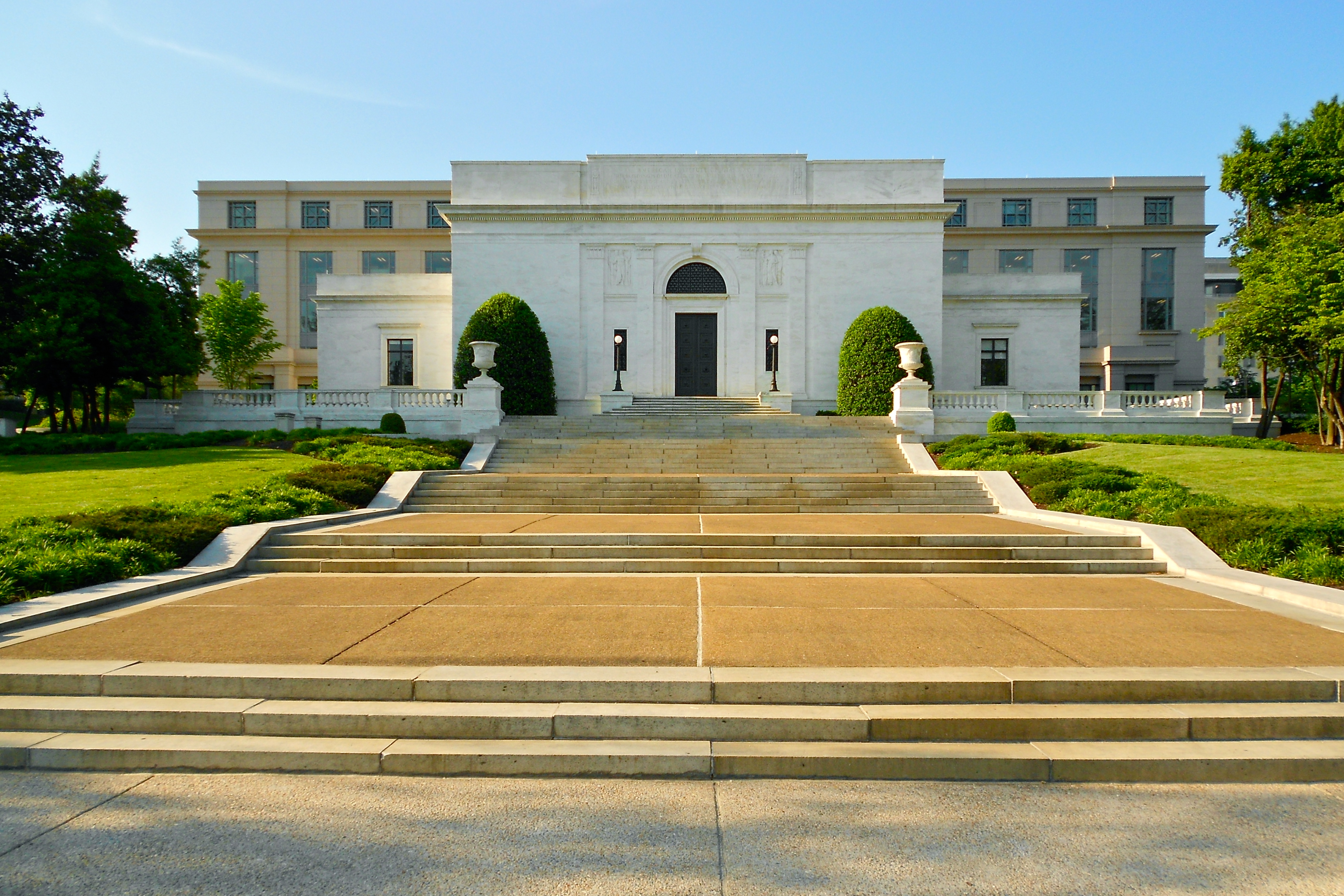
- American Institute of Pharmacy Building in 2012

- Location within Central Washington, D.C. Location within the District of Columbia Location within the United States
- Location: 2215 Constitution Ave., NW., Washington, D.C.
- Coordinates: 38°53′34.03″N 77°02′58.17″W
- Built: 1932
- Architect: Pope, John Russell; George A. Fuller Co.
- Architectural style: Classical Revival, Beaux Arts
- NRHP reference No.: 77001497

Significant dates
- Added to NRHP: August 18, 1977
- Designated DCIHS: January 21, 1977

The American Institute of Pharmacy Building, also known as the Americal Pharmaceutical Association Building and the American Pharmacists Association Building, is a late Beaux Arts style building in Washington, D.C., the headquarters of the American Pharmacists Association. The building, prominently located on Constitution Avenue, is on the only privately held lot in the area, surrounded by protected Federal lands. It was listed on the National Register of Historic Places in 1977.

== History ==
The American Institute of Pharmacy Building was designed by architect John Russell Pope and completed in 1933. It is a one-story building with a full basement partially above grade. Structure is steel and brick with reinforced concrete floor and roof. The building is faced with Vermont marble and faces a wide terrace that overlooks the stepped slope leading down to the Lincoln Memorial. The building is arranged with a strongly centralized mass with subordinate wings to either side. A single monumental door flanked by pilasters and large bronze lamps is the sole punctuation of the facade. Allegorical relief sculpture by Ulysses Ricci embellishes the entrance surround. The building was conceived by Pope to be complementary to the Lincoln Memorial.

Because of the prominence of the site and its relationship to the Lincoln Memorial the American Institute of Pharmacy was required to make extensive land acquisitions and exchanges with the government to create suitable buffers and to allow for the widening of 23rd Street as it approaches the Memorial. White marble was specifically stipulated as the exterior cladding material.

The interior is arranged around a central rotunda, accompanied by a small museum and library, now board room and reception space. Offices are located to the rear, while the basement was planned as laboratory, service and storage space. The rotunda is capped by a low dome resting on pendentives and lighted by an oculus. The flanking museum and library are lighted by skylights.

A three-story addition was built in 1959–1961, designed by Eggers and Higgins and subordinated to the design of the main building. Further additions took place in 2007–2009.
