= Phi Lambda Sigma =

American pharmacy honor society

- ΦΛΣ
- Founded: March 1965; 61 years ago Auburn University
- Type: Honor
- Affiliation: ACHS
- Status: Active
- Emphasis: Pharmacy
- Scope: International
- Colors: Green and Gold
- Publication: The Laurel
- Chapters: 138
- Members: 30,000 lifetime
- Headquarters: 40 Bailey Lane; Uniontown, Pennsylvania 15401; United States
- Website: philambdasigma.org

Phi Lambda Sigma (ΦΛΣ), also known as the National Pharmacy Leadership Society, is a North American college honor society for pharmacy students. It was founded at Auburn University in March 1965.

== History ==
Charlie Thomas, a student at the Auburn University School of Pharmacy, founded Phi Lambda Sigma in March 1965, with the support of the faculty. The mission of Phi Lambda Sigma is to support pharmacy leadership commitment by recognizing leaders and fostering leadership development. After two years of probation, Phi Lambda Sigma received its charter from the Auburn University Student Senate on October 3, 1967.

It was incorporated in Lee County, Alabama, on June 28, 1968, as Phi Lambda Sigma National Fraternity. The name Phi Lambda Sigma was registered with the U.S. Bureau of Patents and Copyrights in 1968. The society also worked with Balfour Company to design its official key in 1968.

The society became national in 1971 with the chartering of the Beta chapter at Samford University. Other chapters followed throughout the 1970s, including Mercer University, the University of Georgia, the University of North Carolina at Chapel Hill, and the University of South Carolina. In 1980, the society announced its plans for national expansion.

As of February 2018, a Phi Lambda Sigma Chapter had chapters at 125 of the 138 American schools and colleges of pharmacy. It had Phi Lambda Sigma had initiated 30,000 members. The society was admitted to the Association of College Honor Societies (ACHS) in 2018.

== Symbols ==
Phi Lambda Sigma's insignia is a key pin, which has a mortar and pestle and the Greek letters ΦΛΣ, surrounded by a laurel wreath. The society's colors are green and gold. Its publication is The Laurel.

== Activities ==
The society hosts an annual leadership summit that provides a certificate and five hours of continuing education units. The summit is open to non-members. Phil Lambda Sigma annually awards scholarships to its student members, including the Charles C. Thomas Scholarship, the Kathlene A. Hawkins Memorial Travel Award, and the PLS-AFPE First Year Graduate Scholarship. The society also presents a variety annual awards, including:

- Albert B. Prescot Leadership Award
- Alumni of the Year Award
- Charles Thomas Leadership Challenge
- Chapter Development Award
- Chapter Member of the Year Award
- Chapter of the Year Award
- Outstanding Chapter Advisor Award
- Mary L. Euler Lifetime Leadership Award (a.k.a. Procter & Gamble National Leader Award)

== Membership ==
Phi Lambda Sigma has student, alumni, faculty, and honorary members. Student members must complete at least one year of coursework toward a pharmacy degree with a 2.50 GPA. In addition, potential student members must be committed to pharmacy leadership and be "of high moral and ethical character". Faculty and honorary members are nominated for the dedication, leadership, and service in the field of pharmacy. Members are peer-selected by current members of the society. Because Phi Lambda Sigma is an honorary professional organization, its members are allowed to join other fraternal and pharmacy organizations.

== Chapters ==
Phi Lambda Sigma chapters has chartered 134 chapters in North America, as of 2024.

== Notable members ==
- Gireesh Gupchup, vice president for academic innovation, planning, and partnerships for Southern Illinois University and former dean and professor of the SIUE School of Pharmacy.
- Timothy Tucker, pharmacist and former president of the American Pharmacists Association

== See also ==
- Honor society
- Professional fraternities and sororities
