= Charles Rudolph Walgreen =

American businessman and pharmacist (1873–1939)

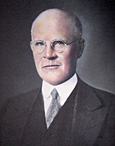
- Born: October 9, 1873; Knoxville, Illinois, U.S.
- Died: December 11, 1939 (aged 66); Chicago, Illinois, U.S.
- Education: Dixon College
- Occupation: Businessman
- Known for: Founding Walgreens
- Spouse: Myrtle Norton Walgreen
- Children: 2, including Charles Jr.

Charles Rudolph Walgreen (October 9, 1873 – December 11, 1939) was an American businessman and pharmacist and the founder of the Walgreens chain of pharmacies and convenience stores. Politically, he was known for his anti-communism.

== Early life ==
Walgreen was born on a farm near Galesburg, Illinois, before moving to Dixon, Illinois, in 1887. He was the son of Swedish immigrants.

In the 1790s, Charles's great-great-great-grandfather, Sven Olofsson, adopted the surname Wahlgren (Swedish pronunciation: [ˈvɑ̂ːlɡreːn]) during his military service, a family fact passed down over the generations. When Charles's father, Carl Magnus Olofsson, came to America from Sweden, he decided to change the family name to Walgreen. When Charles was still quite young he and his family relocated to Dixon, Illinois, in 1887. He attended Dixon High School and Dixon Business College. He was a member of the international fraternity Tau Kappa Epsilon.

As a young adult, he lost part of a finger in an accident at a shoe factory. The doctor who treated him persuaded him to become an apprentice for a local druggist. His interest in pharmacy dated from the time he was employed by D.S. Horton, a druggist in Dixon where he was apprenticed as a pharmacist. In 1893, Walgreen went to Chicago and became a registered pharmacist. At the start of the Spanish–American War, Walgreen enlisted with the 1st Illinois Volunteer Cavalry. While serving in Cuba, he contracted malaria and yellow fever, which continued to plague him for the rest of his life.

== Career ==
After his discharge, Walgreen returned to Chicago and worked as a pharmacist for Isaac Blood. In 1901, he purchased a local store and began operating it as a pharmacy. He opened a second store in 1909, and by 1916, he owned nine drug stores, which he incorporated as Walgreen Co. Walgreens was one of the first chains to carry non-pharmaceuticals as a mainstay of the store's retail selection. Walgreens offered low-priced lunch counters, built its own ice cream factory, and introduced the malted milk shake in 1922. By his death in 1939, more than 490 Walgreens stores were established.

== Personal life ==
=== Political views ===
According to The Chicago Reader, Walgreen was "conservative in many respects", but defended President Franklin D. Roosevelt's Revenue Act of 1935.

In 1935, Walgreen publicly criticized the University of Chicago after his niece, Lucille Norton, allegedly told him she was studying The Communist Manifesto there. He wrote a letter to the university's president, Robert Maynard Hutchins, and trustees declaring his intention to pull Norton out of the university. The letter received considerable attention from Chicago's press, including the Chicago Herald-Examiner. The Illinois Senate opened an investigation into the university, but the hearings were unable to find evidence of communist teachings. Afterwards, Walgreen apologized to Hutchins and donated $12 million to the university in 1937. The two later became friends, with Hutchins even delivering a eulogy at Walgreen's funeral.

=== Family ===
Both Walgreen's son, Charles Rudolph Walgreen Jr., and his grandson, Charles R. Walgreen III, played prominent roles in the company he founded. His daughter, Ruth Walgreen, married Justin Whitlock Dart, who left the Walgreens company after they divorced and went on to control the rival Rexall Drug Stores in 1943. Ruth, in her adult years a published poet, eventually remarried and began spending winters in Tucson, Arizona, where she helped establish the University of Arizona Poetry Center in 1960.

== Legacy ==
Walgreen's donations facilitated the construction of an airport in his hometown of Dixon, Illinois in 1934. In 1964, the airport was renamed the Charles R. Walgreen Field. Pilot Merrill Meigs, a friend of Walgreen, delivered a dedication address.

Walgreen donated $12 million to the University of Chicago in 1937, establishing the Walgreen Foundation at the school. The foundation funded lectures on American society until the 1950s.

In 2006, Walgreen was inducted into the Labor Hall of Honor, run by the United States Department of Labor.

== Sources ==
- Griffin, Marie. Industry 'Legends' Deserve Recognition (Drug Store News, October 9, 1995)
- Ingham, John N. Biographical Dictionary of American Business Leaders (Westport, CT: Greenwood Press, 1983)
- Van Doren, Charles, ed. Webster's American Biographies (Springfield, MA: G. & C. Merriam Co., 1979)
