= Mary Munson Runge =

African-American pharmacist (1928–2014)

Mary Munson Runge (1928 – January 8, 2014) was the first female, the first African American, and the first employee community pharmacist to be elected president of the American Pharmacists Association (APhA).

== Early life and family ==
Runge was born in 1928 in Donaldsonville, Louisiana. Runge's father, John Harvey Lowery, was a pharmacy owner and a physician, notable for running the first pharmacy in Donaldsonville. He was generally regarded as one of the most successful entrepreneurs in Donaldsonville, and was highly charitable with his considerable wealth.

== Career ==
=== Pharmacy practice ===
Runge graduated from the Xavier University of Louisiana College of Pharmacy in 1948. At the time, she was one of the few females in the profession of pharmacy. After graduating from college, Runge moved to California and practiced hospital pharmacy for 21 years. In 1971, she became a community pharmacist at Sylvester Flower's Apothecary. The practice was located in Oakland, California, serving needy patient areas. Runge is quoted to have said, "The greatest experience was helping poor African American people who couldn't even pay for their medicine. Pharmacy gave me an opportunity to help people who needed help."

=== Professional service ===
Runge served in leadership positions within numerous professional organizations. She was president of the Northern California Society of Hospital Pharmacists in 1963 and the California Society of Hospital Pharmacists in 1967. She served on the California State Board of Pharmacy, and was the president of the California Pharmacists Association in 1974. Runge served as the first female APhA representative to the American College of Pharmaceutical Education (ACPE) from 1972 to 1982. In 1979, Runge was sworn in as the president of the American Pharmacists Association (APhA). As an African American female, her appointment ended a 126-year history of Caucasian males serving as APhA's president. Notably, she was also the first employee community pharmacist to have been a president of APhA, rather than an owner of a community pharmacy. As part of her tenure as APhA president, Runge formally created the APhA Task Force on Women in Pharmacy, as well as APhA's Office of Women's Affairs. Her two terms ended in 1981.

She served on federal committees, including the Institute of Medicine Pharmacy Advisory Panel for the study of the costs of educating healthcare professionals, the National Academy of Sciences in 1974, the Reagan-Bush Health Policy Advisory Committee in 1980, the U.S. Department of Health, Education, and Welfare (what would later become the U.S. Department of Health and Human Services), and the Prescription Drug Payment Review Commission.

Runge retired in 1994.

=== Awards ===
Runge received honorary doctorates from the Massachusetts College of Pharmacy (Doctor of Science) and Ohio Northern University (Doctor of Pharmacy) in recognition of her work for the profession. She was named Pharmacist of the Year in 1978 by the California Pharmacists Association. Runge was inducted into the California Pharmacists Association Hall of Fame in 1997. In 1996, she received the Hugo H. Schaefer Award from APhA.

== Death ==
Runge died on January 8, 2014. Her memorial service was held on Saturday, February 15 at the First United Methodist Church in Modesto, California. APhA created a posthumous scholarship in her name.
