= Charles Walgreen III =

American businessperson

Charles R. Walgreen III (1935–2016) was an American businessperson.

== Biography ==
Walgreen, grandson of Charles Walgreen Sr., who founded the Walgreens drugstore chain in 1901, began his career with the company as a stock boy in 1952. He earned a pharmacy degree from the University of Michigan in 1958 and returned to Walgreens, rising through the ranks to become president in 1969, CEO in 1971, and chairman in 1976.

During his tenure, Walgreen doubled the company's store count to over 1,200, shifted its focus to pharmacy, and divested from non-core businesses. He stepped down as CEO in 1998, retired as chairman in 1999, and left the board in 2010.

In 2004, Walgreen donated $2 million to the University of Michigan College of Pharmacy to endow a professorship focused on researching the socioeconomics of health care policies.

Walgreen died in 2016.
