= Phi Delta Chi =

Collegiate pharmacy fraternity

- ΦΔΧ
- Founded: November 2, 1883; 142 years ago University of Michigan
- Type: Professional
- Affiliation: PFA
- Status: Active
- Emphasis: Pharmacy
- Scope: National
- Motto: Alterum Alterius Auxilio Eget "Each Needs the Help of the Other"
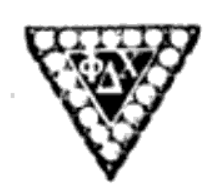
- Member badge
- Colors: Old Gold and Dregs of Wine
- Flower: Red carnation
- Publication: The Communicator
- Chapters: 103
- Nickname: Phi Dex, PDC, PDX
- Headquarters: 116 N Lafayette, Suite B South Lyon, Michigan 48178; United States
- Website: Official website

Phi Delta Chi (ΦΔΧ or Phi Dex) is an American coed professional fraternity. It was founded in 1883 at the University of Michigan in Ann Arbor, Michigan. It was formed to advance the science of pharmacy and its allied interests and to foster and promote a fraternal spirit among its brothers, now both male and female.

== History ==
=== Phi Chi Society ===
On November 2, 1883, eleven men at the University of Michigan formed the fraternity as the Phi Chi Society. These two Greek letters are reported to have stood for Pharmacy and Chemistry. At that time, there were several literary societies at Michigan, but the group's founders believed something should be organized exclusively for the College of Pharmacy.

The founders were Charles E. Bond, F. H. Frazee, Llewellyn H. Gardner, Charles P. Godfrey, Arthur G. Hoffman, A. G. Hopper, Charles F. Hueber, G. P. Leamon, A. S. Rogers, Azor Thurston, and A. T. Waggoner. Albert Benjamin Prescott, then dean of the College of Pharmacy at Michigan, encouraged the founders in the formation of the society. He was made the first honorary member and served as the group's sponsor.

The night of the second meeting of the society, a motion was made but failed to change the name to Phi Delta Chi.

=== Phi Chi Fraternity ===
In 1887, the society still consisted of a single chapter; it reorganized into a Greek letter fraternity and adopted symbols, signs, a ritual, and regalia were adopted. Expansion followed, with the establishment of fourteen chapters within the first 25 years.

However, several years after the establishment of Phi Chi Fraternity, two unrelated local fraternities, also named Phi Chi, were formed to serve medical students: Vermont in 1889 and Kentucky in 1894. By 1905, the two medical fraternities merged, retaining the name Phi Chi. A disagreement arose as to which group had the best claim upon that name. Both fraternities were thriving, with national ambitions, in a situation made more confusing by the fact that they were both classified as professional fraternities.

=== Phi Delta Chi Fraternity ===
In March 1909, Phi Chi Fraternity (Pharmacy) adopted the name Phi Delta Chi for the organization, an action that was ratified at its March 1910 meeting.

Phi Delta Chi originally accepted only men in the fields of pharmacy and chemistry, the latter including both chemistry majors and chemical engineers. During the depression days of 1928–1933, however, difficulties arose because the fraternity was serving two professions. As a result, membership requirements were changed by 1950 to include pharmacy only. It has been a matter of considerable pride to Phi Delta Chi brothers that the organization remained intact through wars and economic crises, and also expanded its work.

In further support of the profession of Pharmacy, Phi Delta Chi was instrumental in the foundation of the Rho Chi International Honor Society for Pharmacy in 1922, also formed at Michigan. Phi Delta Chi brothers were Rho Chi's first president, vice-president, and treasurer.

In 1949, the Fraternity held an unusual mail-in ballot to consider and adopt a change to the Constitution to prohibit discrimination based on race or religion. This action came shortly after WWII, when all fraternities were adjusting to the massive, and more diverse, influx of new college-bound recipients of the G.I. Bill. The slogan "Leaders in Pharmacy" was adopted in 1956.

In 1965, brothers from the fraternity's Chi chapter helped establish Phi Lambda Sigma, a new national pharmacy leadership society, like Rho Chi is an honor society within the field. The Fraternity became co-educational in 1976 as a result of Title IX.

Centennial celebrations in 1983 culminated with the dedication of a plaque at the University of Michigan School of Pharmacy, commemorating Phi Delta Chi's first 100 years of accomplishments. Today, the Alpha chapter hosts brothers from every chapter for an annual reunion on November 2 to celebrate the founding of Phi Delta Chi in 1883. Expansion has continued in recent decades, with many new chapters keeping pace with the establishment of new schools of pharmacy in the 1990s and 2000s.

Phi Delta Chi hosts an annual leadership development seminar for its members. Since its founding, Phi Delta Chi has chartered more than 70 collegiate chapters and has welcomed more than 50,000 men and women.

== Symbols and publications ==
The official publication of the Fraternity is The Communicator, first published nationally in 1906. It has been published regularly since that year.

The original badge is a plain gold triangle with a point at the bottom, displaying the letters Φ Δ Χ. The flower is the red carnation. The Fraternity's colors are Old Gold and Dregs of Wine.

== Philanthropy ==
Phi Delta Chi’s 60th Grand Council (Memphis, 1995) authorized the fraternity's executive council to establish a not-for-profit foundation to advance the leadership, educational, and other benevolent missions of the fraternity. This charge was fulfilled in the creation of the Pharmacy Leadership & Education Institute, Inc. (PLEI), which held the inaugural meeting of its board of directors during APhA's 143rd annual meeting in Nashville, March 1996.

The institute is the fraternity’s charitable and educational arm, advancing the fraternal mission of training pharmacy’s future leaders. The Internal Revenue Service recognizes the institute as a 501(c) (3) charitable organization. The PLEI coordinates the Prescott Pharmacy Leadership Award, the Leader Development Seminar, and other educational events for fraternity members and associates within the pharmacy profession. The institute is led by a board of directors of distinguished brothers and colleagues. The grand president, grand past president, and executive director serve ex officio on the PLEI board of directors.

== Chapters ==
Since its founding, Phi Delta Chi has chartered more than seventy collegiate chapters.

== Notable members ==
Since its founding, Phi Delta Chi has initiated more than 50,000 men and women. Following are some of its notable members.

- Eli Lilly
- Hubert H. Humphrey
- Albert Benjamin Prescott (honorary),

== See also ==
- Professional fraternities and sororities
- Rho Chi, co-ed, pharmacy honor society
