= Zada Mary Cooper =

American pharmacist and professor

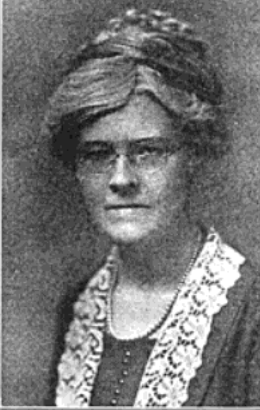
- Cooper, from a 1930 publication
- Born: January 31, 1875; Quasqueton, Iowa, US
- Died: May 6, 1961 (aged 86); Omaha, Nebraska, US
- Occupation: College professor
- Years active: 1897–1942
- Known for: Founder of Kappa Epsilon and Rho Chi

Academic background
- Education: University of Iowa

Academic work
- Discipline: Pharmacy
- Institutions: University of Iowa College of Pharmacy

Zada Mary Cooper (January 31, 1875 – May 6, 1961) was an American pharmacist and a professor of pharmacy at the University of Iowa. Cooper helped found the Women's Section of the American Pharmacists Association in 1912. She was its president in 1917. She founded the pharmacy fraternities Kappa Epsilon and Rho Chi.

== Early life ==
Zada Mary Cooper was born in Quasqueton, Iowa on January 31, 1875. She attended the Normal Institute in Independence, Iowa. She graduated from the University of Iowa College of Pharmacy in 1897. In 1898, she was the vice president of the university's Pharmaceutical Alumni Association.

== Career ==
Cooper became a registered pharmacist on March 9, 1875. Beginning as an assistant, she worked at the University of Iowa College of Pharmacy for 45 years, becoming an instructor in 1905, an assistant professor in 1912, and an associate professor in 1942. She retired as a professor emeritus in 1942. She established and organized the department's first library. She was the founding editor of the College of Pharmacy's News, serving in this capacity from 1924 to 1942.

On July 9, 1909, Cooper was elected the vice president of the Iowa Pharmaceutical Association. She helped found the Women's Section of the American Pharmacists Association in 1912. She served on its Executive and Membership committees from 1913 to 1916 and was elected its president in 1917.

She founded the pharmacy fraternity Kappa Epsilon on May 13, 1921. She was its first chair, a grand council member, and edited its journal, The Bond. Cooper was also a founder of Rho Chi, an international honor society for pharmaceutical sciences. She held several of its offices, including secretary, executive council member, and vice president, and served as president from 1938 to 1940.

Cooper was active within the American Association of Colleges of Pharmacy and was successful in lobbying the American Association of University Women to accept membership from graduates of pharmacy colleges.

== Honors ==
Cooper was an honorary member of the national honor society Iota Sigma Pi.

She was one of the few women listed in American Men of Science (renamed American Men and Women of Science in 1971).

The American Journal of Pharmaceutical Education dedicated its winter 1961 issue to Cooper for her work on its publication committee and her work with the American Association of Colleges of Pharmacy. It included several articles about Cooper.

The Kappa Epsilon fraternity annually awards Zada M. Cooper Scholarships to five of its active collegiate members.

On April 30, 2016, the University of Iowa College of Pharmacy held the Zada Cooper Leadership Symposium, featuring several speakers on the subject of pharmacy education.

== Personal life ==
While working the university, Cooper lived in Red Oak, Iowa. She was regent of the Pilgram chapter of the Daughters of the American Revolution. She was a membere of the University Club.

After retiring, Cooper lived with her two brothers in Villisca, Iowa. She died on May 6, 1961, in Omaha, Nebraska.

== Selected publications ==
- "Why Apprentices Should Take a Course in College Before Engaging in Practice", Proceedings of the Iowa Pharmaceutical Association, 1904
- "Ladies as Druggists: Their Value to the Profession", Proceedings of the Iowa Pharmaceutical Association, 1905
- "The Ideal Pharmacist", Proceedings of the Iowa Pharmaceutical Association, 1906
- "Formula on the Bottle – Why Should the Druggists and the People Demand it", Proceedings of the Iowa Pharmaceutical Association, 1906
- "Co-operation Between Physicians and Pharmacists, The Advantages and How Best to Bright It About", Proceedings of the Iowa Pharmaceutical Association, 1909
- "Women in Pharmacy", The Druggists Circular, 1914
- "Some Phases of a Pharmacist's Duty to the Public", Journal of the American Pharmacists Association, 1914
- "Should a Library Reading Course Be Made a Part of the Curriculum of Colleges of Pharmacy", Journal of the American Pharmacists Association, 1916
- "Women Should be Urged to Study Pharmacy", The Druggists Circular, 1918
- "Where are Pharmacists Ten Years After Graduation from College", Journal of the American Pharmacists Association, 1919
- "Pharmaceutical Arithmetic", Spatula, 1922
- "The Lure of Research", Journal of the American Pharmacists Association, 1926
