= University of Arizona Poetry Center =

Poetry center in Tucson, Arizona

Coordinates: 32°14′13.3″N 110°56′57.8″W

The University of Arizona Poetry Center in Tucson, Arizona, is among the most extensive collections of contemporary poetry in the United States. It is the largest such collection which is "open shelf."

== History of the collection and the center ==
The University of Arizona Poetry Center was founded in 1960 by Ruth Stephan as a place "to maintain and cherish the spirit of poetry." The Poetry Center's mission is to promote poetic literacy and sustain, enrich and advance a diverse literary culture. The Poetry Center sponsors numerous programs, including readings, lectures, classes and workshops, writing residencies, writers-in-the-schools, writers-in-the-prisons, contests, exhibitions and online resources, including standards-based poetry curricula.

An area of special emphasis within the College of Humanities, the Poetry Center is open and fully accessible to the public. In fall 2007, the Poetry Center moved into a 17,000-square-foot (1,600 m^{2}) building named for Tucson arts patron Dr. Helen S. Schaefer. The Poetry Center's new building, designed by Line and Space, LLC, makes the Center's entire collection of contemporary poetry fully accessible for the first time in decades. The facility also provides meeting and gathering spaces for the Center's extensive literary programs and activities.

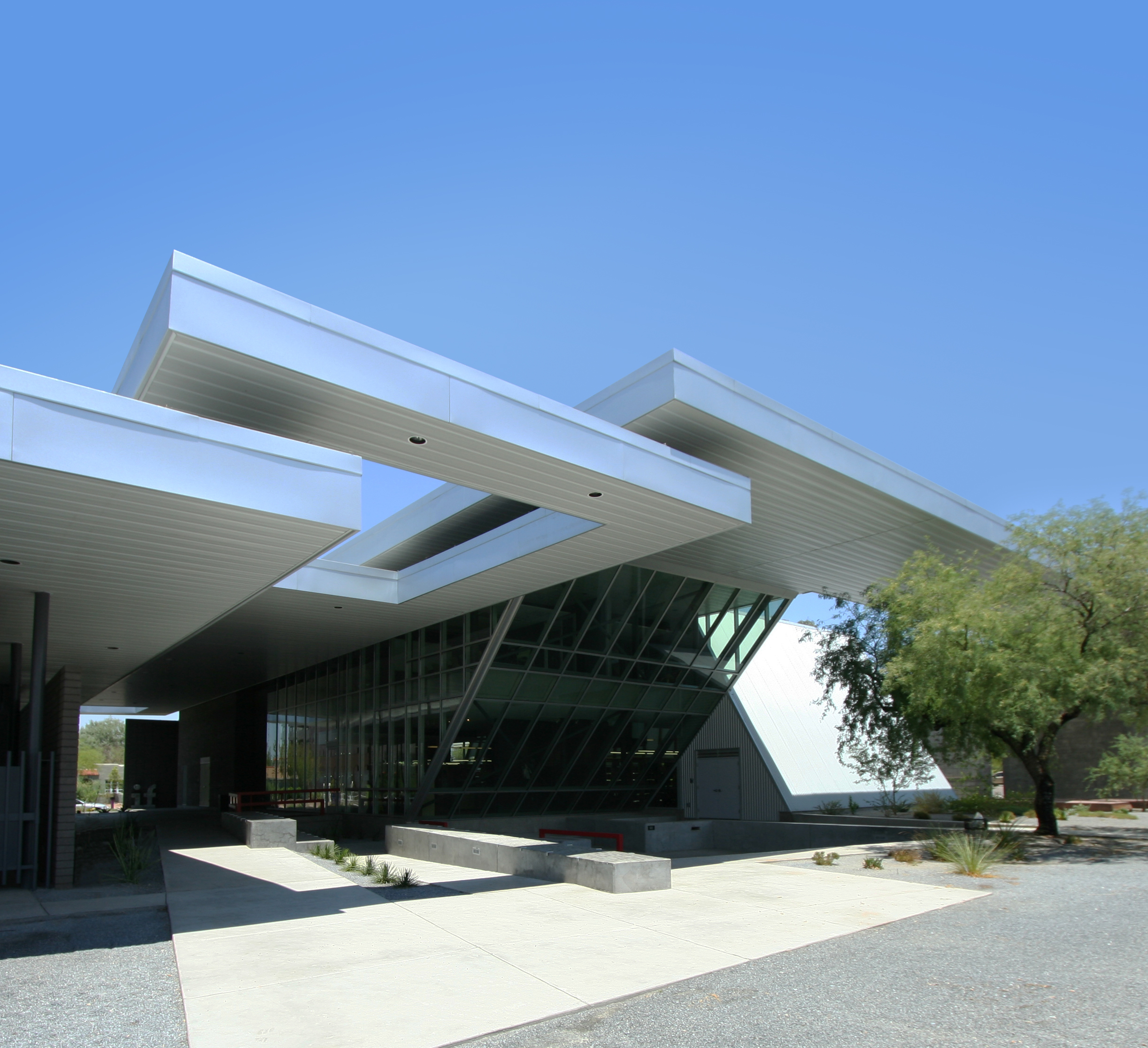
South facade and Entry of the University of Arizona Poetry Center designed by architect Line and Space

=== Ruth Stephan and the early history of the Poetry Center ===
Ruth Walgreen Stephan (1910–1974) was a writer and philanthropist who began visiting Tucson in the 1950s. She grew up in Chicago, the daughter of Charles Rudolph Walgreen (the founder of the national drug store chain Walgreens) and attended Northwestern University. Her first notable publication, a poem titled "Identity," appeared in Harper's Magazine in 1937. Her work soon began appearing in other leading magazines, such as Poetry and Forum. In the 1940s and 1950s she wrote both poetry and novels (The Flight and My Crown, My Love) and with her husband, the artist John Stephan, published an influential international quarterly of art and literature called The Tiger's Eye. After spending a year in Peru, she compiled and translated the first English-language collection of Quechua songs and tales. She also produced a series of records, The Spoken Anthology of American Literature, for international audiences. She lived in Japan for a while and made a documentary film on Zen Buddhism.

In 1954 Ruth Stephan began spending winters in Tucson, staying in a cottage near the University of Arizona campus. In 1960, she presented the property to the University. If the Poetry Center's initial home was modest, its founder's vision was not. She wanted to create a welcoming place and a distinguished collection that could encourage students, faculty and community members "to encounter poetry without intermediaries."

In 1960 Robert Frost arrived in Tucson by train to read at the dedication of the new Poetry Center on November 17. Ruth Stephan presided at the dedication with Arizona Congressman Stewart Udall and University President Richard Harvill. During this historic visit, Congressman Udall asked Frost to consider reading a poem at John F. Kennedy's upcoming Presidential inauguration.

For decades after her initial gift, Ruth Stephan made additional donations of land, stocks, cash and books to the Center. In 1963 the University of Arizona awarded Ruth Stephan an honorary PhD for "high achievement as a poet, novelist, translator and editor with an international reputation and as a sponsor and patron of imaginative literature." She served as an active member of the Center's Advisory Board until shortly before her death in 1974.

=== The library collection ===
Ruth Stephan seeded The Poetry Center's collection with a gift of several hundred books. Her collection focused on contemporary poetry in English and also included translations of great poets from around the world. In her "Notes on Establishing and Maintaining a Poetry Collection," Stephan wrote:

The collection should consist of poetry, of biographies and bibliographies of poets, volumes of poets' letters and of prose and plays by poets. There should be no books of criticism or essays on poetry unless these books were written by poets: for example Francis Thompson's exquisite piece on Shelley, and T. S. Eliot's essays. Occasionally poets have written novels, as did William Carlos Williams, and these should be included for a rounded understanding of a poet."

Ms. Stephan's founding collection of books includes works by Ezra Pound, Kenneth Rexroth, Kenneth Patchen, Stanley Kunitz, W. H. Auden, John Berryman, Edna St. Vincent Millay and others, most of which are editions published in the 1940s and 1950s. Also included are a number of volumes of Asian and French poetry as well as classic works.

Intending the collection to have national and international significance, Ms. Stephan regularly shopped for books for the Poetry Center on her journeys, and she urged the staff to acquire materials demonstrating the widest possible range of poetry, from its known beginnings in chants and song to contemporary experiments. According to Poetry Center annual reports, the collection grew by 100 volumes during the 1962-1963 academic year and had reached 900 volumes by Spring 1963. By 1975 the total number of volumes had increased to 4,060 and there was "a large collection of poetry periodicals and poetry recordings."

The library collection, supported by an acquisitions endowment provided by Ms. Stephan and her mother Myrtle Walgreen in the mid-1970s, has grown to include over 70,000 items. These works include 40,000 books of poetry, 300 broadsides, 3000 photographs, and 1500 recordings, many of which record the Poetry Center's Reading Series (founded in 1962). The Poetry Center's catalog is accessible through Worldcat (OCLC). The collection is non-circulating.

== Highlights of the library collection ==
The Ruth Stephan and Myrtle Walgreen Collection includes, on a representative level, the work of most poets writing in English in the 20th and 21st centuries. Poets from earlier centuries and translations into English are represented on a more selective level. Stephan's original vision for the collection has been maintained, with the addition of some acquisitions of critical works by major critics (e.g., Bloom, Vendler, and Perloff).

Audio-Video Collection - voca
The University of Arizona Poetry Center's Audio Video Library features recordings from the Center's long-running Reading Series and other readings presented under the auspices of the Center. The earliest of these recordings is a Robert Creeley reading from 1963. "voca" includes multiple recordings of poets who have read for the Poetry Center numerous times over the years. All recordings are made available with the permission of the reader.

Rare Book Room
The Rare Book Room safeguards important items of the collection in a temperature- and humidity-controlled environment, preserving them for future generations of researchers and readers. Limited-edition works, books which are central to the poetry tradition, and artist-made books and collaborative book projects are included. In this archive, scholars will find materials only available in a few libraries around the world.

Children's Corner
The Poetry Center's children's collection includes hundreds of volumes of poetry for young people, as well as an assortment of curricular and pedagogical materials for use in teaching poetry to children, including the Poetry Center's own publication VERSE! Poetry for Young Children. Activities for children, school groups, and community organizations and families are regularly presented in this area.

Exhibitions
The Jeremy Ingalls Gallery in the reception area of the Poetry Center features permanent and regular special exhibitions highlighting work from the collection and the Rare Book Room. The Wall of Poets features a selection of black-and-white photographs of writers who have visited the Poetry Center since 1960. This photographic tradition, started by the Poetry Center's first director, LaVerne Harrell Clark, continues to this day.

== Readings, lectures, and symposia ==
Beginning in 1962 with readings by Stanley Kunitz and Kenneth Rexroth, the Poetry Center has presented over 1000 writers, including most major U.S. poets of this era, significant international visitors, and emerging writers. Lectures by visiting and local writers and scholars are held throughout the year. Symposia with visiting and local writers focused on a wide variety of literary topics are also presented.

== Residencies and the tradition of the Poet's Cottage ==
Part of the Poetry Center's first home was a small house reserved for poets and writers visiting Tucson. The residence, or "Poet's Cottage," has always been a part of the Center's special character. The Fieries and Snuffies wrought-iron legend displayed over the door refers to the creative process. Ruth Stephan wrote that poets and writers "work in fiery bursts of creativity and snuff out most of the results with an eraser." In 1994, the Poetry Center inaugurated a residency program to offer poets a month-long opportunity to develop work and to access the Center's archives. The residencies are awarded through a national juried competition. The residence in the new Poetry Center building carries on the tradition of the Poet's Cottage by providing a secluded studio apartment and private garden patio within the complex.

== Poetry Center educational programs ==
The Poetry Center administers a diverse range of programs and educational activities that create poetic literacy and cultivate a wide literary readership.

Adult Programs
Throughout the year, the Poetry Center offers non-credit creative writing workshops as well as classes and seminars on poetry and prose. Shop Talk discussion groups offer mini-lectures on featured poets, followed by a conversation on the poet's work. The Closer Look Book Club provides an opportunity for in-depth conversation about prose literature. The Poetry Center also provides support to the Arizona State Prison Creative Writing Workshops founded by University of Arizona Regents' Professor Richard Shelton and supported by a grant from the Lannan Foundation. Inmates attend weekly workshops, write, edit and submit work to a dedicated journal, Rain Shadow, which is available at the Poetry Center.

Pre-K to 12 Programs
The Poetry Center offers a monthly Family Days activity program for children of all ages and their families. It also offers online poetry resources and lesson plans for teachers of all grade levels. High school outreach includes a statewide Bilingual Corrido Contest and Southern Arizona support of the National Poetry Out Loud Competition.

Contests
The Poetry Center sponsors a number of annual contests to benefit and reward writers. In addition to the Corrido Contest, the Center sponsors a national writer's residency, and writing contests for University of Arizona graduate and undergraduate students.

== The Humanities Seminars Program ==
The Poetry Center and the University of Arizona Humanities Seminars Program formed a partnership to provide a permanent home for the Seminars within the new Poetry Center. Founded by Dorothy Rubel in 1984 to satisfy the intellectual needs of the growing adult population of Southern Arizona, the Humanities Seminars Program offers non-credit courses led by University faculty throughout the year.

== Location ==
The University of Arizona Poetry Center is located at 1508 E. Helen St. in Tucson, Arizona, 85721.
