= Asgar Zaheer =

- Occupation: Neuroscientist
- Known for: Research on glia maturation factor
- Title: Professor

Asgar Zaheer is a neuroscientist and retired Professor of Neurology at the University of Missouri at Columbia and the Emeritus Associate Professor at the University of Iowa.

Zaheer was previously a Research Career Scientist at the Department of Veterans Affairs for 33 years. His research examines the role of Glia Maturation Factor (GMF) in neuroinflammation and neurodegeneration, with a focus on mechanisms associated with Multiple Sclerosis (MS), Parkinson's disease (PD), Alzheimer's disease (AD) and Traumatic Brain Injury (TBI). He has published in journals including Proceedings of the National Academy of Sciences of USA, Journal of Biological Chemistry, Journal of Neurochemistry, Brain Research, Biochemistry, Brain, Behavior, and Immunity, and Frontiers in Neuroscience.

== Education ==
Zaheer completed his Bachelor's degree at Marathwada University from 1966 to 1970 and pursued a Master's degree there from 1970 to 1972. He subsequently earned his Ph.D. in Biochemistry from Bombay University (Tata Memorial Hospital, Cancer Research Institute) between 1973 and 1979.

== Career ==
From 1979 to 1982, Zaheer served as a Postdoctoral Research Associate at the University of Iowa, progressing to roles such as Assistant Research Scientist from 1982 to 1987, Associate Research Scientist from 1987 to 1988, and Research Scientist from 1988 to 1995. In 1995, he was appointed Associate Director, a position he held until 2004, and Adjunct Assistant Professor, serving until 2005. He also assumed the role of Adjunct Assistant Professor of Surgery in 2003, continuing until 2006.

In 2005, Zaheer took on two concurrent roles: Assistant Professor of Neurology from 2005 to 2011 and Director of Neurochemistry from 2005 to 2016. Additionally, in 2010, he joined the graduate programs in Neuroscience and Bioscience, where he remained until 2016. He was promoted to Associate Professor in 2011, serving in this capacity until 2016. Since 2016, he has held the title of Emeritus Associate Professor.

Zaheer worked at the Veterans Affairs Health Care System, where he served as a Research Health Science Specialist from 1988 to 2016, and a Research Career Scientist at the Truman VA from 2016 to 2021. Furthermore, he was the Director of the VA Open Field Blast TBI Facility from 2018 to 2022. Simultaneously, he was a Professor and Director of the Center for Translational Neuroscience at the University of Missouri from 2016 to 2022.

== Research ==
Zaheer, widely focused on the field of neuroscience, has worked on elucidating the role and mechanisms of Glia Maturation Factor (GMF) within the central nervous system, thereby contributing to the understanding of neurodegenerative diseases. His research findings about GMF, a protein that plays a key role in neuroinflammation, has contributed to the understanding of neurodegenerative diseases like Multiple Sclerosis (MS), Parkinson's (PD), Alzheimer's (AD), and Traumatic brain Injury (TBI). He has explored how an increased expression of GMF in cells can contribute to neuroinflammation, which in turn can activate pro-inflammatory gene expression, leading to neural damage and ultimately cause neuronal death.

A considerable body of Zaheer's work has focused on understanding how GMF induction and activation in neuroglial cells contribute to the pathogenesis of brain disorders and injuries.

Through his research, he has identified GMF as a significant and less-explored factor impacting the progression of neurodegenerative diseases. Highlighting the role of GMF in neuroinflammation, his studies have explored how GMF exacerbates neuron damage in neurodegenerative diseases through promoting oxidative stress and apoptosis, the process of programmed cell death that can lead to neurodegeneration. His work has also identified GMF as a modulator of various signaling pathways in the brain, thereby presenting opportunities for therapeutic intervention. Favorably modulating GMF activity or inhibiting its overexpression could potentially alleviate symptoms or slow the progression of various neurodegenerative disorders.

Zaheer has made contributions to other aspects of neuroscience, particularly his work related to the molecular and cellular mechanisms underlying brain injuries.

== Awards and honors ==
- 1995 – Special Contribution Award, Department of Veterans Affairs
- 2004-2007, 2008-2012, 2014–2018 – VA Merit Review Award, Department of Veterans Affairs
- 2004-2009, 2009-2013, 2011–2016 – NIH RO1 Award, National Institute of Neurological Disorders and Stroke
- 2015-2020 – NIH RO1 Award, National Institute of Aging

== Selected articles ==
- Lim, R., Miller, J. F., & Zaheer, A. (1989). Purification and characterization of glia maturation factor beta: a growth regulator for neurons and glia. Proceedings of the National Academy of Sciences, 86(10), 3901-3905.
- Thangavel, R., Van Hoesen, G. W., & Zaheer, A. (2008). Posterior parahippocampal gyrus pathology in Alzheimer's disease. Neuroscience, 154(2), 667-676.
- Zaheer, S., Wu, Y., Sahu, S. K., & Zaheer, A. (2010). Overexpression of glia maturation factor reinstates susceptibility to myelin oligodendrocyte glycoprotein-induced experimental autoimmune encephalomyelitis in glia maturation factor deficient mice. Neurobiology of disease, 40(3), 593-598.
- Kempuraj, D., Khan, M. M., Thangavel, R., Xiong, Z., Yang, E., & Zaheer, A. (2013). Glia maturation factor induces interleukin-33 release from astrocytes: implications for neurodegenerative diseases. Journal of Neuroimmune Pharmacology, 8, 643-650.
- Khan, M. M., Zaheer, S., Nehman, J., & Zaheer, A. (2014). Suppression of glia maturation factor expression prevents 1-methyl-4-phenylpyridinium (MPP+)-induced loss of mesencephalic dopaminergic neurons. Neuroscience, 277, 196-205.
- Raikwar, S. P., Thangavel, R., Dubova, I., Selvakumar, G. P., Ahmed, M. E., Kempuraj, D., ... & Zaheer, A. (2019). Targeted gene editing of glia maturation factor in microglia: a novel Alzheimer’s disease therapeutic target. Molecular neurobiology, 56, 378-393.
- Ahmed, M. E., Selvakumar, G. P., Kempuraj, D., Raikwar, S. P., Thangavel, R., Bazley, K., ... & Zaheer, A. (2020). Glia maturation factor (GMF) regulates microglial expression phenotypes and the associated neurological deficits in a mouse model of traumatic brain injury. Molecular Neurobiology, 57(11), 4438-4450.
- Selvakumar, G. P., Ahmed, M. E., Iyer, S. S., Thangavel, R., Kempuraj, D., Raikwar, S. P., ... & Zaheer, A. (2020). Absence of glia maturation factor protects from axonal injury and motor behavioral impairments after traumatic brain injury. Experimental neurobiology, 29(3), 230.
