= Journal of the American Pharmacists Association =

- Discipline: Pharmacy
- Language: English
- Edited by: Pamela Heaton, PhD, BSPharm, MS

Publication details
- Former name(s): Journal of the American Pharmaceutical Association
- History: 1912 (113 years ago) to present
- Publisher: American Pharmacists Association (United States)
- Frequency: Bimonthly
- Impact factor: 2.076 (2018)

Standard abbreviations
- ISO 4: J. Am. Pharm. Assoc.

Indexing
- ISSN: 1544-3191 (print); 1544-3450 (web)
- LCCN: 2003212218
- OCLC no.: 715062221

Links
- Journal homepage; Online access; Online archive

The Journal of the American Pharmacists Association is a bimonthly peer-reviewed medical journal covering pharmacy-related topics. It was established in 1912, published as Journal of the American Pharmaceutical Association with slightly varying title until 1977, as American Pharmacist (1978 – 1996), then again as the Journal of the American Pharmaceutical Association (1996 – 2002); it obtained its current title in 2003, and is the official journal of the American Pharmacists Association (the scientific journal of the association is the Journal of Pharmaceutical Sciences). The current editor-in-chief is Pamela Heaton, PhD, BSPharm, MS (University of Cincinnati).

== Abstracting and indexing ==
The journal is abstracted and indexed in:

- Biological Abstracts
- Chemical Abstracts
- Excerpta Medica
- FDA Clinical Experience Abstracts
- Index Medicus/MEDLINE/PubMed
- Science Citation Index Expanded
- Current Contents/Clinical Medicine

According to the Journal Citation Reports, the journal has a 2018 impact factor of 2.076.
