= David W. Murhammer =

American chemist

David W. Murhammer is professor and former department chair of chemical and biochemical engineering at the University of Iowa, specializing in biochemical engineering. He is also a member of the Center for Biocatalysis and Bioprocessing there. Murhammer received his B.S. and M.S. degrees from Oregon State University, and his Ph.D. in chemical engineering at the University of Houston in 1989. Murhammer was a graduate student under Charles F. Goochee. He then joined the college of engineering in 1989 as assistant professor, becoming professor in 2003.

Murhammer also worked briefly in the zirconium refining industry, which sparked his lifelong dedication to chemical process safety.

== Research interests and publications ==
Research interests include baculoviruses, with emphasis on their bioinsecticide production and effects on insect cell cultures.

Murhammer is an editor of Baculovirus and Insect Cell Expression Protocols. He has also made numerous presentations at government and industrial engineering laboratories and conferences. He has written a total of 43 journal articles. Among his major recent peer-reviewed publications are:

- Wang, Ying; Oberley, Larry W.; Howe, Dale; Jarvis, Donald L.; Chauhan, Gaurav; Murhammer, David W. (2004). "Effect of Expression of Manganese Superoxide Dismutase in Baculovirus-Infected Insect Cells". Applied Biochemistry and Biotechnology. 119 (2). Springer Science and Business Media LLC: 181–194. doi:10.1385/abab:119:2:181. ISSN 0273-2289. PMID 15531788. S2CID 38514999.
- Saarinen, Mark A.; Reece, Julie S.; Arnold, Mark A.; Murhammer, David W. (5 September 2008). "Monitoring and Controlling the Dissolved Oxygen (DO) Concentration within the High Aspect Ratio Vessel (HARV)". Biotechnology Progress. 19 (4). Wiley: 1335–1341. doi:10.1021/bp0257574. ISSN 8756-7938. PMID 12892499. S2CID 21894565.
- Saarinen, Mark A.; Murhammer, David W. (13 November 2002). "The response of virally infected insect cells to dissolved oxygen concentration: Recombinant protein production and oxidative damage". Biotechnology and Bioengineering. 81 (1). Wiley: 106–114. doi:10.1002/bit.10460. ISSN 0006-3592. PMID 12432586. S2CID 24102521.
- Wang, Ying; Oberley, Larry W.; Murhammer, David W. (2001). "Evidence of oxidative stress following the viral infection of two lepidopteran insect cell lines". Free Radical Biology and Medicine. 31 (11). Elsevier BV: 1448–1455. doi:10.1016/s0891-5849(01)00728-6. ISSN 0891-5849. PMID 11728817.
- Wang, Ying; Oberley, Larry W; Murhammer, David W (2001). "Antioxidant defense systems of two lipidopteran insect cell lines". Free Radical Biology and Medicine. 30 (11). Elsevier BV: 1254–1262. doi:10.1016/s0891-5849(01)00520-2. ISSN 0891-5849. PMID 11368923.

== Honors and memberships ==
He is Associate Editor of Applied Biochemistry and Biotechnology, and a member of the American Chemical Society; American Institute of Chemical Engineers; American Society for Engineering Education; Society for Free Radical Biology and Medicine.

He regularly teaches courses in "Process calculations", "Engineering flow/Heat exchange", "Chemical process safety", and "Introduction to biochemical engineering".
