= J. Roger Porter =

American microbiologist (1909–1979)

J. Roger Porter (1909 in Alma, Nebraska – 1979 in Iowa City, Iowa) was an internationally known microbiologist. Porter married Majorie Ann Perkins in 1934. He was the father of four children (Roberta, Carol, Katherine, and John).

== Life and work ==
Porter graduated from Iowa State University, with B.S. and M.S. degrees in Bacteriology in 1933 and 1935. He obtained his Ph.D. in Bacteriology and Chemistry from Yale University in 1938. His career on the University of Iowa's Department of Microbiology faculty spanned the period 1938 through 1977. He was Department Head from 1949 through his retirement in 1977, when he became an emeritus professor. He served on 19 standing committees within the university.

He authored an important text and reference book entitled, Bacterial Chemistry and Physiology, which was published in 1946 by John Wiley and Sons. He served as Editor-in-Chief of the Journal of Bacteriology from 1951 through 1961. He was Chairman of the Conference of Biological Editors Committee on Form and Style from 1958 through 1964, which published the widely used Style Manual for Biological Journals. He published 47 articles in recognized scientific journals.

Porter served in leadership positions on numerous professional and governmental committees. Following is a selection of service:

- Conference of Biology Editors, chairman, 1962–1963
- American Society for Microbiology, President, 1964
- American Institute of Biological Sciences, President, 1967
- U.S. National Committee for International Union of Biological Sciences, chairman, 1967–1969
- U.S. House of Representatives, Panel on Science and Technology, 1970–1974
- U.S. Air Force, Scientific Advisory Board Committee on Disposal of Herbicide Orange, 1972–1974
- Appointed by President Gerald Ford as U.S. Delegate to the 18th General UNESCO Conference, Paris, 1974
- American Academy of Arts and Sciences-National Academy of Sciences, Joint Committee on UNESCO, 1976–1977
- International Association of Microbiology Societies, Elected President-Elect, 1978 (to take office in 1982)
- National Academy of Sciences, National Research Council, Committee on Science Programs of UNESCO, 1977–1979

== Awards Received ==
- Pasteur Award, 1961, Society of Illinois Microbiologists
- Council of Biology Editors, Meritorious Award, 1973
- Honorary Member, II Mechnikov All-Union Scientific Society of Microbiologists and Epidemiologists, Moscow, 1974
- Distinguished Achievement Citation, Iowa State University Alumni Association, 1975
- American Society for Microbiology, Honorary Member, 1979

== Awards in His Name ==
- United States Federation for Culture Collections/J. Roger Porter Award
- Walter Bierring-Roger Porter Award (University of Iowa College of Medicine)

== Bibliography ==
- Bacterial Chemistry and Physiology, John Wiley and Sons, Inc., 1946
- University of Iowa Libraries
