= Kappa Epsilon =

American pharmacy fraternity

- ΚΕ
- Founded: May 13, 1921; 104 years ago Iowa City, Iowa
- Type: Professional
- Affiliation: PFA
- Former affiliation: PPA
- Status: Active
- Emphasis: Pharmacy
- Scope: National
- Motto: Cogito Ergo Sum "I think, therefore, I am"
- Member badge
- Colors: Red and White
- Flower: Red rose
- Jewel: Pearl
- Chapters: 43 collegiate, 10 alumni
- Headquarters: 6510 Telecom Drive; Indianapolis, Indiana 46278; United States
- Website: www.kappaepsilon.org

Kappa Epsilon (ΚΕ) is an American professional pharmacy fraternity founded in Iowa in 1921. Today, KE has 43 collegiate chapters and ten alumni chapters. Over 20,000 women and men have been initiated into ΚΕ since its founding.

== History ==
Kappa Epsilon was established on May 13, 1921, in the Hall of Pharmacy and Chemistry at the University of Iowa. Its founders were professor Zada M. Cooper and members of women's pharmacy clubs at the University of Iowa, the University of Minnesota, and the University of Nebraska. The fraternity was founded to unite female pharmacy students in an era when women were a minority in the profession. Its name was taken from the pharmacy club at the University of Minnesota, the oldest of the three clubs.

In 1942, the fraternity published an official songbook that included original compositions such as the "Kappa Epsilon Pledging Song." The songbook was revised in the 1960s. To encourage women to become pharmacists, Kappa Epsilon published several books, including Women in Pharmacy in 1950, She Is a Pharmacist in 1958, and Pharmacy-Career for the Modern Girl in 1970.

The fraternity was incorporated in January 1960 in Minnesota. Every two years, the fraternity holds a convention where national officers are elected and collegiate and alumni members can network. At the 15th convention in April 1947, the fraternity updated its policies to allow Jews to be admitted. At its 31st convention in 1977, Kappa Epsilon voted to allow men to join as full members; this action was in response to Title IX and the loss of chapters from campuses that prohibited gender discrimination.

== Symbols ==
Kappa Epsilon's motto is Cogito Ergo Sum or "I think, therefore, I am". Its colors are red and white. Its flower is the red rose, and its jewel is the pearl.

== Philanthropy ==
The Kappa Epsilon Foundation was established on May 21, 1992, to support educational programs, provide student loans, and fund research in pharmacy. The Zada Cooper Scholarship, named for the fraternity's founder, is given to five students every year by the foundation. The Nellie Wakeman Fellowship is given to a member in his/her last year of pharmacy school who wishes to pursue graduate study. For both awards, the recipient must be a fraternity member in good standing.

Kappa Epsilon's national project is the promotion of breast cancer awareness. Many ΚΕ chapters participate in the Race for the Cure or Relay For Life. KE chapters are also encouraged to promote awareness of other women's health issues such as osteoporosis. KE's recently added the Pharmacy Career Opportunity Recruitment Project (Pharm-CORP) to their National Project. Pharm-CORP works to introduce pharmacy careers to middle and high-school-aged students and encourages them to excel in math and the sciences.

== Chapters ==
Kappa Epsilon has collegiate and alumni chapters.

== See also ==
- Professional fraternities and sororities
- Rho Chi, co-ed, pharmacy honor society
