= University of Michigan College of Pharmacy =

Pharmacy school in Ann Arbor, Michigan

Coordinates: 42°16′38.8″N 83°44′06.9″W

- Motto: Artes, Scientia, Veritas
- Type: Public
- Established: December 29, 1876; 149 years ago
- Parent institution: University of Michigan
- Dean: Vicki Ellingrod
- Undergraduates: 160
- Postgraduates: 500
- Location: Ann Arbor, Michigan, U.S.
- Website: pharmacy.umich.edu

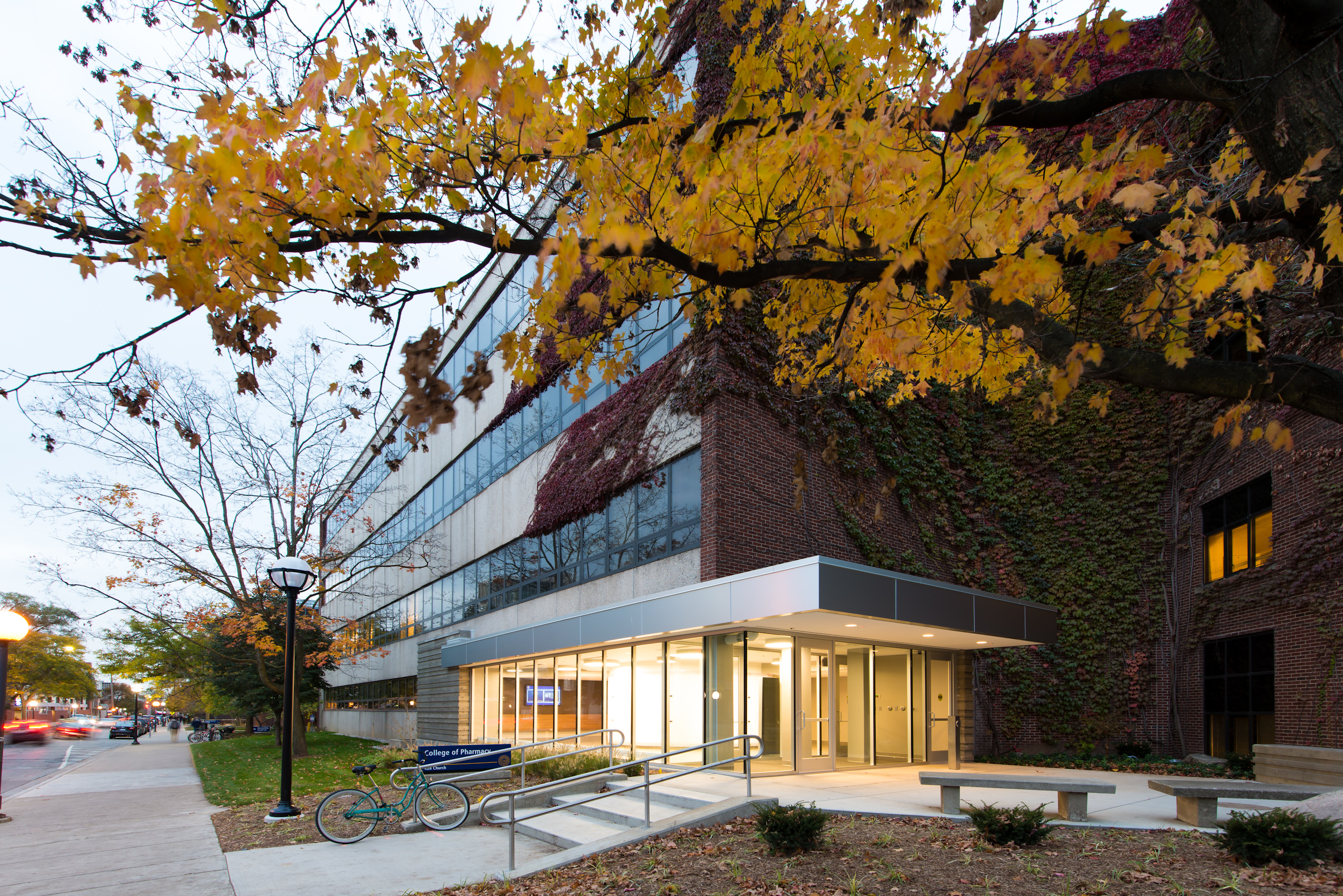
College of Pharmacy Building

The University of Michigan College of Pharmacy is the pharmacy school of the University of Michigan. It is situated on the university's central campus in Ann Arbor, Michigan.

== History ==
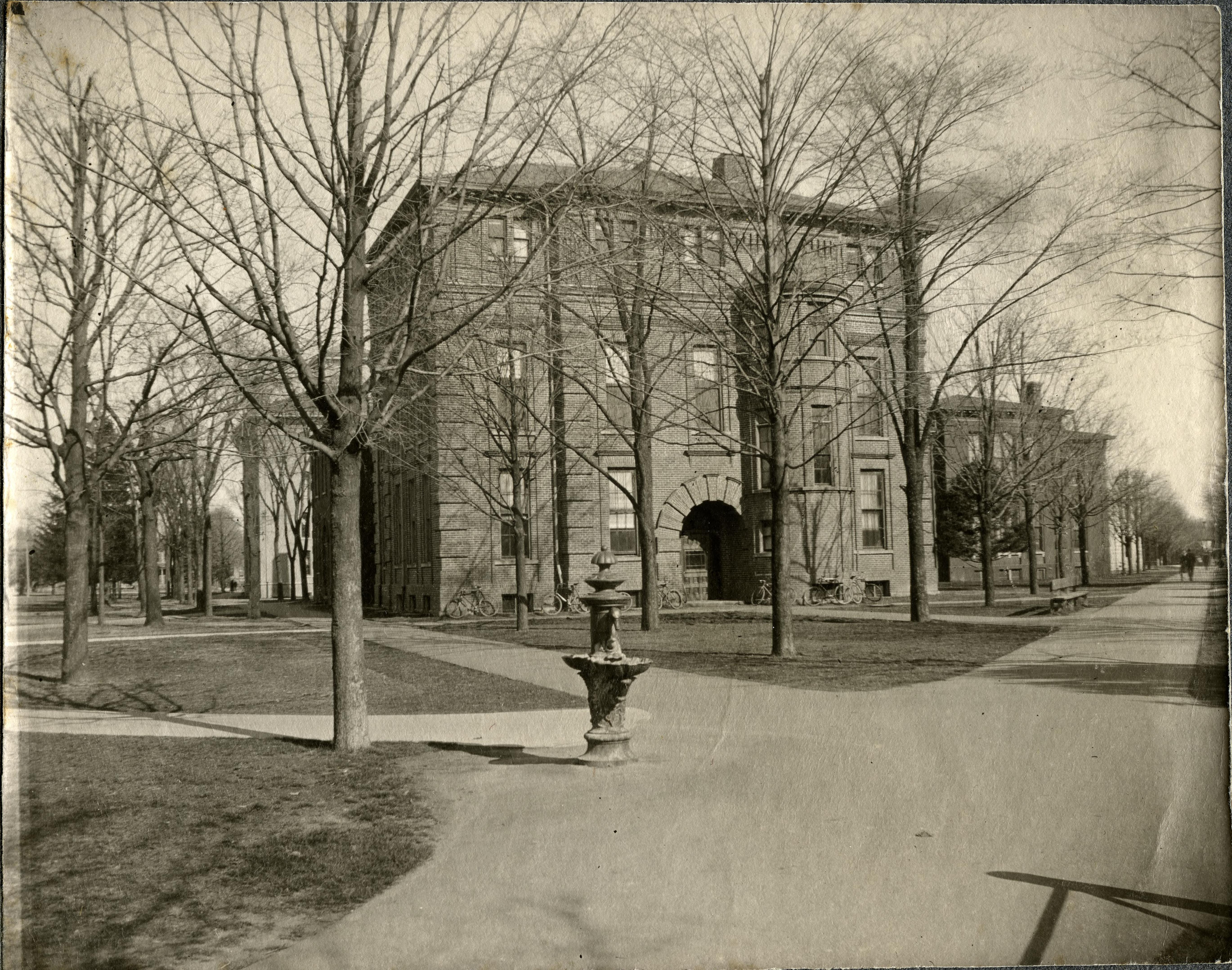
Pharmacology Building, ca. 1898

The University of Michigan began teaching pharmacy in 1868 within the College of Literature, Science and the Arts. Eight years later, on December 29, 1876, Albert B. Prescott established the university's School of Pharmacy, the nation's first school of pharmacy at a state university. As the first dean, Dr. Prescott introduced the concept of basic science education as a prerequisite to practical training for those pursuing a pharmacy degree.

Phi Delta Chi (ΦΔΧ) was founded on 2 November 1883 at the College by 11 men, led by Dean Prescott. The fraternity was formed to advance the science of pharmacy and its allied interests, and to foster and promote a fraternal spirit among its brothers, now both male and female.

In 1916 the school was renamed the College of Pharmacy. Today, the College is a member of the University of Michigan Health System, and is fully accredited by the American Council for Pharmacy Education.

== Notable alumni ==
The sisters Amelia and Mary Upjohn, daughters of the founder of the Upjohn Company, graduated in pharmacy in June 1871, just three months after the first two women to receive degrees at the University of Michigan.

Other notable graduates of the U-M College of Pharmacy include Josiah K. Lilly Jr., grandson of the founder of the Eli Lilly Company; John Gideon Searle, grandson of the founder of G. D. Searle; Charles Rudolph Walgreen Jr., and Charles R. Walgreen III, son and grandson of the founder of the Walgreens chain of drugstores; Gregory Peck, Sr., father of the actor, and Tiffany Porter, track and field athlete.

== See also ==
- List of pharmacy schools
