= Rho Chi =

International honor society for pharmaceutical sciences

- ΡΧ
- Founded: May 19, 1922; 104 years ago University of Michigan
- Type: Honor
- Affiliation: ACHS
- Status: Active
- Emphasis: Pharmaceutical
- Scope: International
- Colors: Purple and White
- Chapters: 132
- Members: 113,646+ lifetime
- Headquarters: c/o University of Michigan College of Pharmacy; 428 Church Street; Ann Arbor, Michigan 48109-1065; United States
- Website: www.rhochi.org

Rho Chi (ΡΧ) is an international honor society for pharmaceutical sciences. It was founded on May 19, 1922, to "encourage high scholastic achievement and fellowship among students in pharmacy and to promote the pharmaceutical sciences".

== History ==
The organization evolved from the Aristolochite Society which had been established at the University of Michigan as a local honor society in 1908. Discussion of national expansion began in 1917, met with urging at that same time from pharmacy faculty, which resulted in a second chapter of Aristolochite being established in 1919 at what is now Oregon State University, and a third at the University of Oklahoma. The Society adopted the name Rho Chi Society that year, with the grant of a charter from the State of Michigan. Further support was provided by an American Conference of Pharmaceutical Faculties committee chaired by Zada Mary Cooper in 1920–1921. In a show of support for the new honor society, Alpha chapter of Phi Delta Chi provided substantial support for Rho Chi. Rho Chi's first president, vice-president and treasurer had all been members of Phi Delta Chi, the Professional Pharmaceutical Sciences Fraternity, also established at Michigan.

The society grew slowly at first, with eight chapters by 1927, and ten more over the next five years. Expansion continued more rapidly, resulting in a chapter count of 110 as of 2014, and 128 by 2019 (according to the society's website).

Rho Chi Society was admitted to membership in the Association of College Honor Societies, or ACHS, in 1947.

Government is by convention, held annually in conjunction with the meeting of the American Association of Colleges of Pharmacy.

The 1991 edition of Baird's Manual noted the Society had 46,500 initiates, while by 2019 ACHS records note 113,646 initiates.

== Chapters ==
The Society has established 140 chapters since 1922, most of which remain active.

== Membership requirements ==
Undergraduates eligible for election as active members of a chapter must have completed a minimum of 75 hours of scholastic work, be ranked in the upper 20 percent of their class, and have attained a scholastic average equivalent to the second highest letter grade. They must also show a "capacity for achievement in the science and art of pharmacy as evidenced by character, personality and leadership." Provisions are made for graduate students and faculty to join, with the intent that chapters encourage all levels of membership.

== Scholarships ==
The Society seeks to encourage research in pharmacy. In 1972 it established a first-year graduate scholarship. In 1992, the first-year graduate scholarship was awarded in conjunction with the American Foundation for Pharmaceutical Education (AFPE) Board of Grants. This scholarship is awarded, on a competitive basis, to a student in the final year of professional studies or to a member who has completed professional studies. Only members of the Rho Chi Society who enter graduate programs in accredited schools/colleges of pharmacy leading to the Ph.D. degree are eligible to win. In 2003 a similar post-doctoral clinical research scholarship was established and is likewise administered by the Rho Chi Scholarship Committee. This Scholarship is awarded to a Rho Chi member entering the second year of fellowship training.

In addition to these, small cash awards are presented to chapters who are selected in the annual Chapter Awards Program, based upon competitive theme entries suggested each year by the Society's Executive Council and/or sustained activities of the chapter.

== Publications ==
From 1933-1993, the Society published its annual report, The Report of Rho Chi, containing complete accounts of the activities of the Executive Council, the National Office, and local chapters. It distributed the Report in print versions to both collegiate and honorary members. Although the Report of Rho Chi is no longer printed, the content is nonetheless published through the Society's website, www.rhochi.org.

A historical study, called The Rho Chi Society, written by Roy A. Bowers and David L. Cowen, was first issued by the Society in 1955 in cooperation with the American Institute of the History of Pharmacy. This work was first published in the American Journal of Pharmaceutical Education (1955;19:244-284). A fifth revision, edited by Robert A. Buerki, published in 1992 is the current edition. Rho Chi plans to publish future editions through the Society's website.

The Society maintains a website with information for chapters, alumni and institutions. Members and guests are welcome to visit the site or to contact the National Office through e-mail for further information.

== Traditions ==
The badge of the Rho Chi Society is an old-fashioned key, incorporating the Greek Letters ΡΧ in a specific configuration, raised on an oblong eight-sided base. The Greek letters, "Rho" and "Chi," were originally selected because, when placed in the relative position in which they are found on the Rho Chi Key, they are emblematic of the prescription sign. The colors attached to the seal of membership were chosen to indicate the royalty of purple and the loyalty of white. The eight sides of the Key, although they have had different meanings in the past, now represent chemistry, biology, physiology, pharmaceutics, pharmacology, and the biomedical, social/administrative, and clinical sciences.

The motto of Rho Chi is "To advance practice and pharmaceutical sciences through the encouragement and recognition of sound scholarship."

== See also ==
- Professional fraternities and sororities
