= American Pharmacists Association =

US society of pharmacists

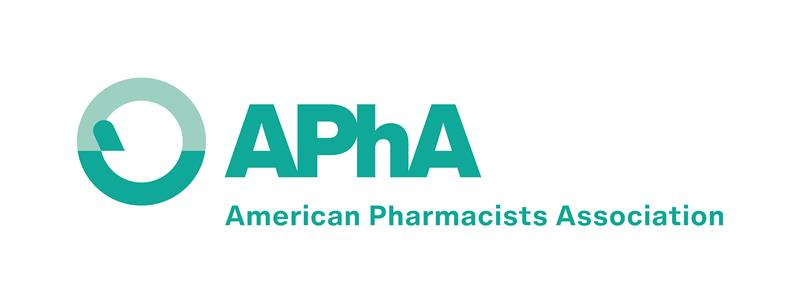
- Abbreviation: APhA
- Formation: October 6, 1852
- Type: Professional Association
- Headquarters: American Pharmacists Association Building; Washington, D.C.
- Region served: United States
- Fields: Pharmacy
- Members: More than 62,000
- Key people: Michael Hogue (Chief Executive Officer) Alex C. Varkey (President) Randy McDonough (President-elect) Valerie Prince (Past-President)
- Website: http://www.pharmacist.com
- Formerly called: American Pharmaceutical Association

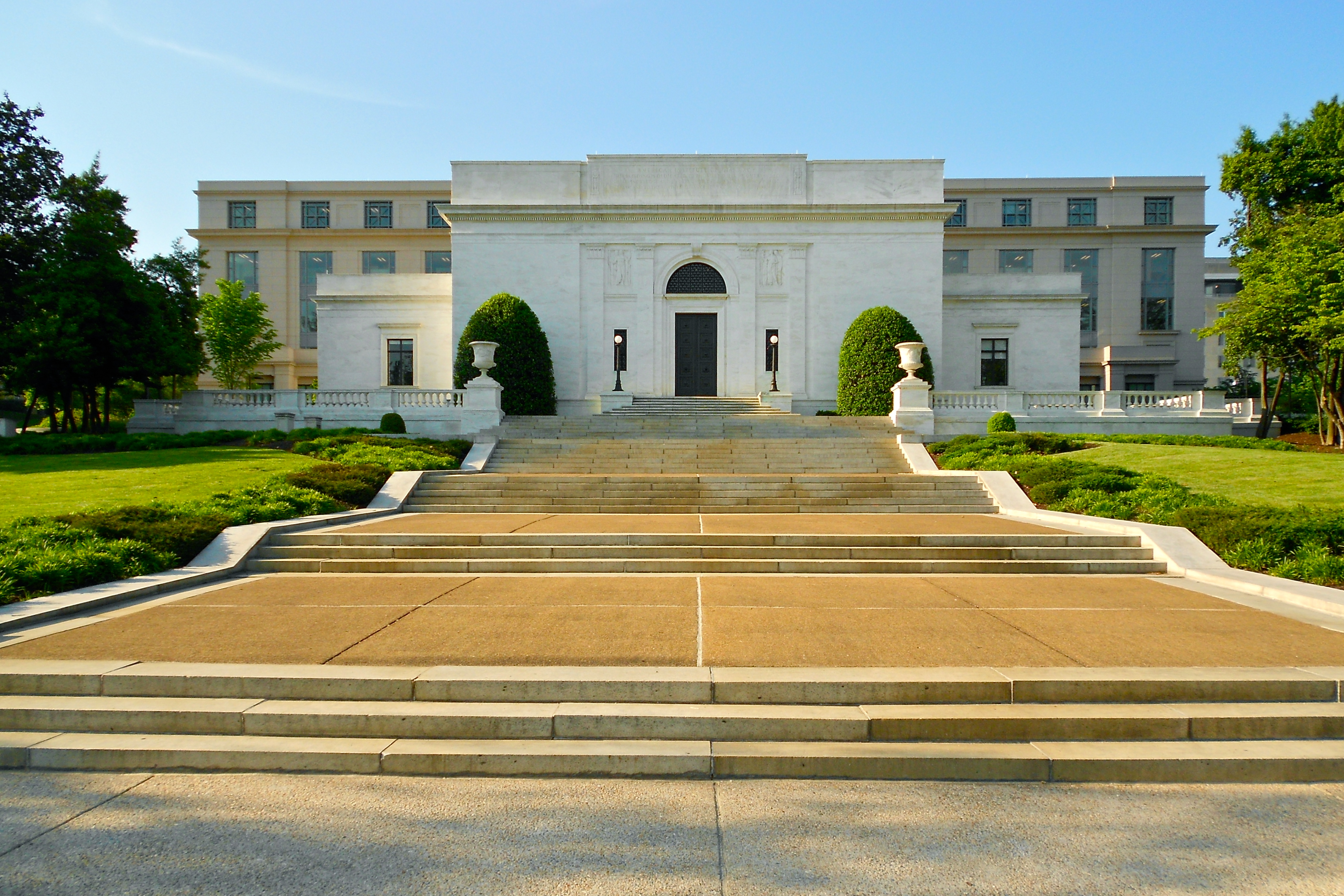
American Institute of Pharmacy Building in Washington, D.C.

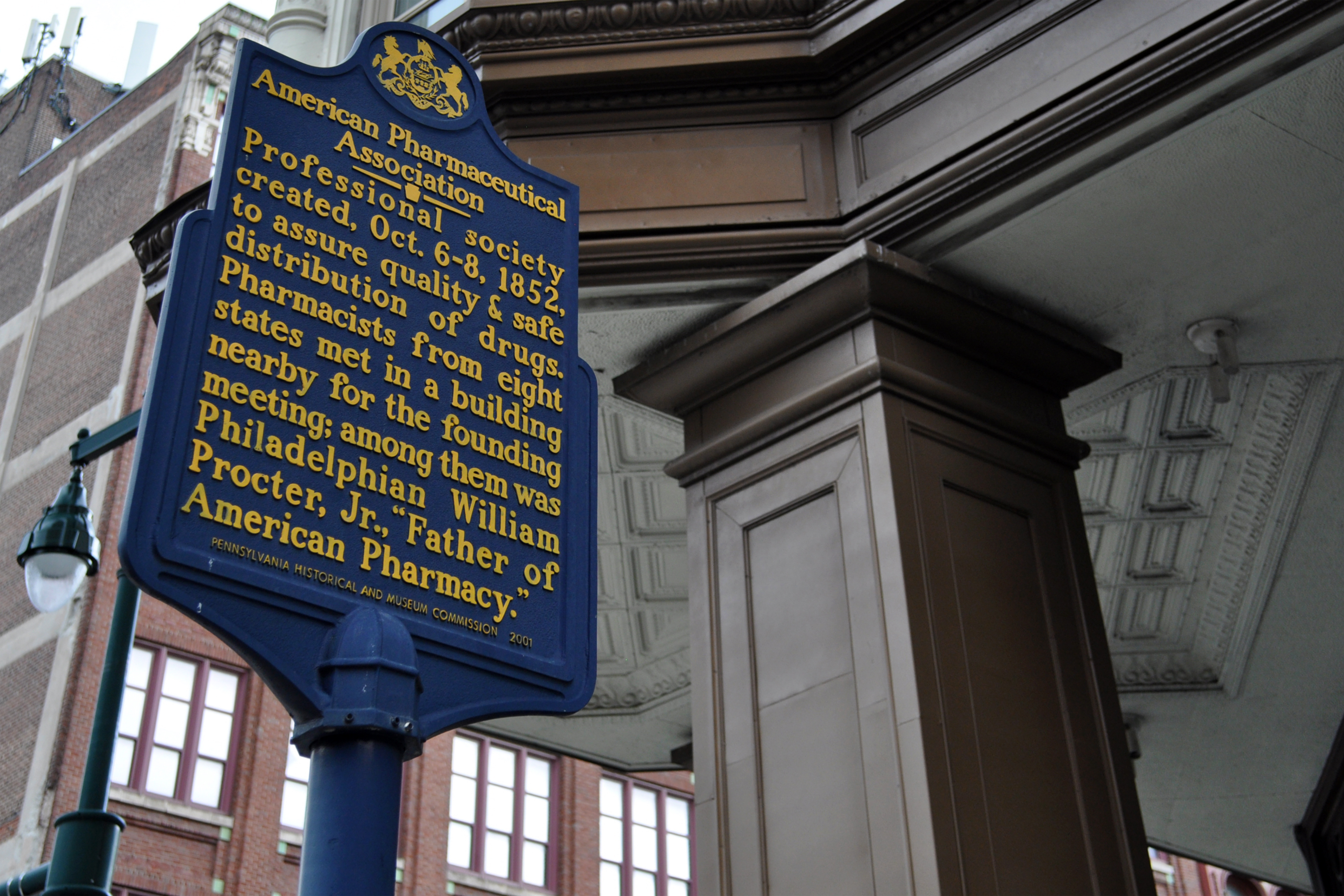
American Pharmaceutical Association Historical Marker at N. 7th and Market Sts. in Philadelphia

The American Pharmacists Association (APhA, previously known as the American Pharmaceutical Association), founded in 1852, is the first-established professional society of pharmacists in the United States. The association consists of more than 62,000 practicing pharmacists, pharmaceutical scientists, student pharmacists, pharmacy technicians, and others interested in the profession. Nearly all U.S. pharmacy specialty organizations were originally a section or part of this association.

== Notable people ==
Mary Munson Runge became the first woman and the first African-American elected president of this association in 1979; she was president for two terms, from 1979 to 1981.

== Organization ==
All members choose one of these three Academies :

- American Pharmacists Association - Academy of Pharmacy Practice and Management (APhA–APPM)
- American Pharmacists Association - Academy of Pharmaceutical Research and Science (APhA–APRS)
- American Pharmacists Association - Academy of Student Pharmacists (APhA–ASP)

== Activities ==
The Annual Meeting & Exposition provides a forum for discussion, consensus building, and policy setting for the pharmacy profession. The association's Board of Trustees is responsible for broad direction of the association. Policy is developed by the APhA House of Delegates that meets each year at the association's Annual Meeting & Exposition. The House of Delegates has representatives from all major national pharmacy organizations, state pharmacy associations, federal pharmacy and APhA's three academies.

In the second quarter of 2021, APhA received a $202,000 grant from Pfizer to “support effective pharmacy based pneumococcal vaccine immunization services.”

== Publications ==
The Association publishes two peer-reviewed journals:

- The Journal of the American Pharmacists Association, the official peer-reviewed journal of the society publishing articles on pharmacy practice, therapeutics, and health issues.
- The Journal of Pharmaceutical Sciences, a peer-reviewed scientific journal dealing with pharmaceutical science and biotechnology

It also publishes:

- Student Pharmacist, intended for pharmacy students,
- Transitions, an online newsletter
- APhA DrugInfoLine, a website with summaries of current developments and new drugs
- Pharmacy Library, a series of approved textbooks.

== See also ==
- American Institute of Pharmacy Building, the Association's headquarters building in Washington, D.C., listed on the National Register of Historic Places
- Board of Pharmacy Specialties, independent subdivision of the APhA that certifies pharmacists in specialities
- Journal of the American Pharmacists Association, the Association's official journal
- Remington Medal, awarded annually by the APhA
