= Edmonton Hundred Historical Society =

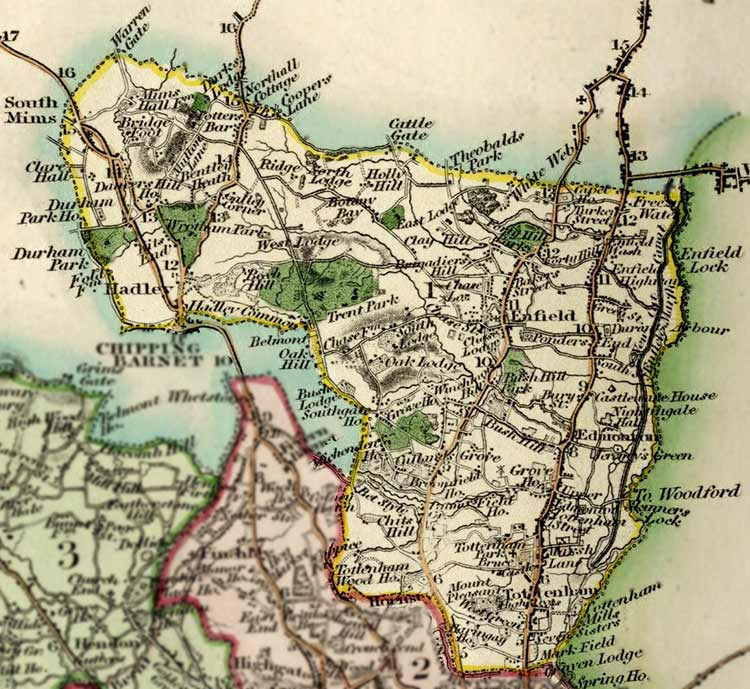
1820 map of the Edmonton Hundred by Greenwood based on the boundaries stated in Domesday Book of 1086.

The Edmonton Hundred Historical Society is an English historical society devoted to the study of the area covered by the Edmonton Hundred (a hundred being an ancient division of a county). The society is a registered charity No. 299073. David Pam, FRHS, was the president until his death in 2014.

== Selected publications ==
The society has published over 60 works in its "occasional papers" series as well as numerous other works.

- Avery, D. Heinous and Grievous Offences. ISBN 0902922521
- Avery, D. Madam Susanna Avery, Her Book. Capels Manor, Enfield, its Occupants, Garden and Kitchen 1688. ISBN 0902922548
- Avery, D. Saxon Enfield: The Place-Name Evidence and Scholars and Pluralists: Three Tudor Vicars in Enfield. ISBN 0902922556
- Avery, D. The Medieval Merchant-Gentry of Edmonton Hundred. ISBN 0902922564
- Burnby, J.G.L. & A.E. Robinson. And they Blew Exceeding Fine. ISBN 0902922254
- Burnby, J.G.L. & A.E. Robinson. Guns and Gunpowder in Enfield. ISBN 0902922475
- Burnby, J.G.L. & A.E. Robinson. Now Turned Into Fair Garden Plots. ISBN 0902922416
- Burnby, J.G.L. Drovers and Tanners of Enfield and Edmonton. ISBN 0902922483
- Burnby, J.G.L. Elizabethan Times in Tottenham, Edmonton and Enfield. ISBN 0902922572
- Collicott, S. Enfield School Board. ISBN 0902922440
- Dalling, G. David Waddington and the Great Pew Controversy. ISBN 0902922335
- Dalling, G. Southgate and Edmonton Street Names. ISBN 0902922491
- Doree, S. Domesday Book and the Origins of Edmonton Hundred. ISBN 0902922459
- Gough, T.W. War-time Letters from the Tottenham Home Front. ISBN 0902922513
- Graham, M. Chase Farm Schools. ISBN 0902922211
- Hawkes, H.G. Some Reflections on Education in Tottenham. ISBN 0902922505
- Hawkes, H.G. The Reynardsons and their Almshouses. ISBN 0902922378
- Hoare, E. Work of the Edmonton Vestry, 1739-43. ISBN 0902922084
- Keeble, P. & R. Musgrove. Who was Heinrich Faulenbach? ISBN 0902922653
- McIllven, R. The Edmonton Local Board of Health. ISBN 0902922157
- Mott, R. A Southgate Boyhood. and B. M. Griffiths Williams. Highfield House, c.1818-1952. ISBN 0902922610
- Musgrove, R. (Ed.) When the Gas Man Came to Call. (Memories of Reginald Chase) ISBN 9780902922679
- Pam, D. A Woodland Hamlet - Winchmore Hill. ISBN 0902922629
- Pam, D. Edmonton Ancient Village to Working Class Suburb. ISBN 0902922645
- Pam, C. Edmonton in the Early Twenties. The Garden City Estate. The Battle of the Flags. ISBN 090292253X
- Pam, D. Enfield Town - Village Green to Shopping Precinct. ISBN 9780902922662
- Pam, D. The Hungry Years. Survival in Edmonton and Enfield before 1400. ISBN 0902922386
- Phillips, P.L. Upon My Word I am No Scholar. ISBN 0902922408
- Robinson, J. The History of Tottenham Grammar School. ISBN 0902922351
- Tottenham Revisited. ISBN 0902922637
