= Burnby (disambiguation) =

Burnby may refer to:

- Burnby, village in the East Riding of Yorkshire, England.
- Burnby Hall Gardens, gardens and museum in Pocklington, East Riding of Yorkshire
- J. G. L. Burnby (1923-2010), president of the British Society for the History of Pharmacy
