= History of pharmacy =

The history of pharmacy as a modern and independent science dates back to the first third of the 19th century. Before then, pharmacy evolved from antiquity as part of medicine. Before the advent of pharmacists, there existed apothecaries that worked alongside priests and physicians in regard to patient care.

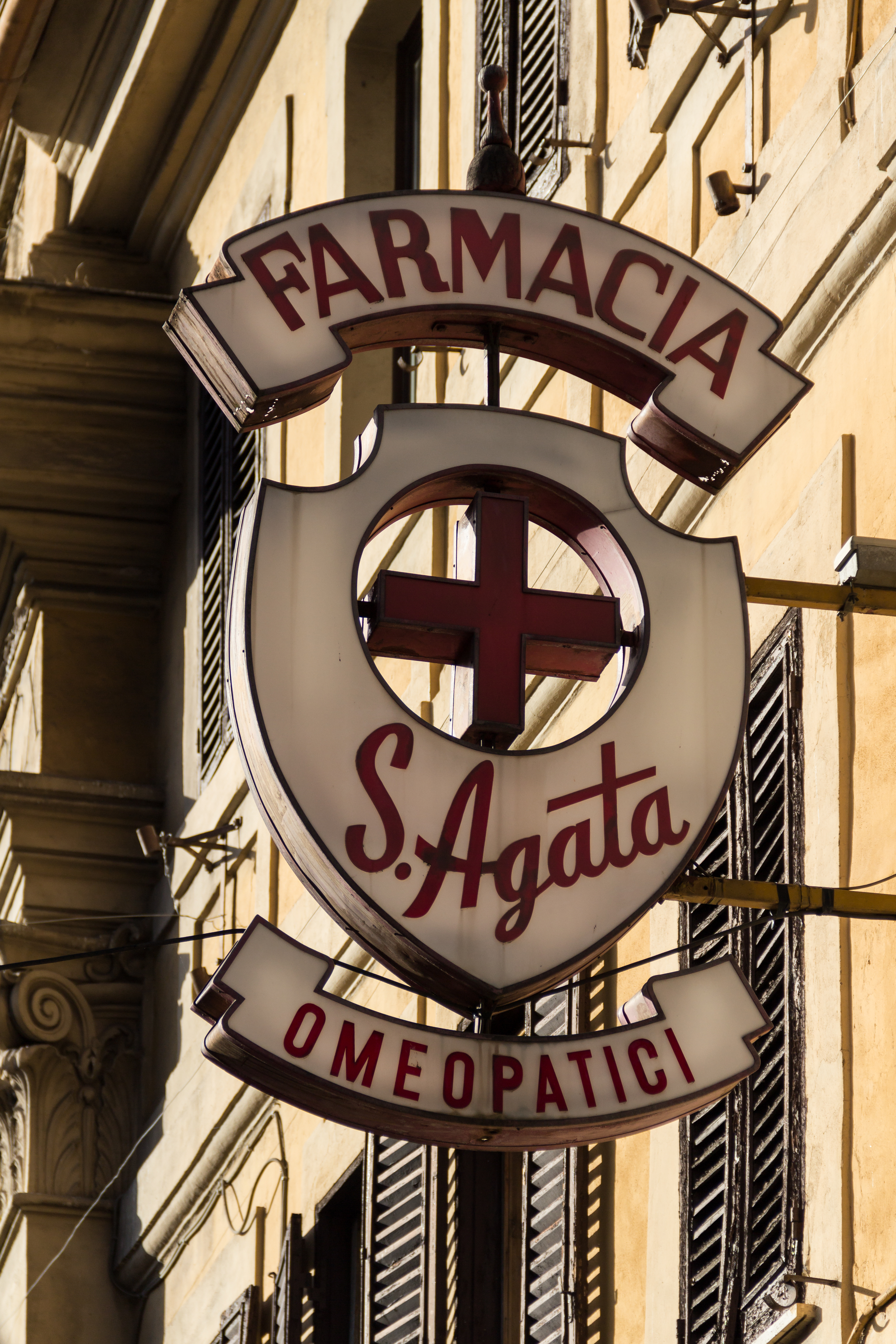
Pharmacy in Rome, Italy

== Prehistoric pharmacy ==
Paleopharmacological studies attest to the use of medicinal plants in pre-history. For example, herbs were discovered in the Shanidar Cave, and remains of the areca nut (Areca catechu) in the Spirit Cave. Prehistoric man learned pharmaceutical techniques through instinct, by watching birds and beasts, and using cool water, leaves, dirt, or mud as a soothing agent.

== Ancient Era ==
=== Mesopotamia and Egypt ===
Sumerian cuneiform tablets record prescriptions for medicine. Ancient Egyptian pharmacological knowledge was recorded in various papyri, such as the Ebers Papyrus of 1550 BC and the Edwin Smith Papyrus of the 16th century BC.

The very beginnings of pharmaceutical texts were written on clay tablets by Mesopotamians. Some texts included formulas, instructions via pulverization, infusion, boiling, filtering and spreading; herbs were mentioned as well. Babylon, a state within Mesopotamia, provided the earliest known practice of running an apothecary i.e. pharmacy. Alongside the ill person included a priest, physician, and a pharmacist to tend to their needs.

=== Greece ===
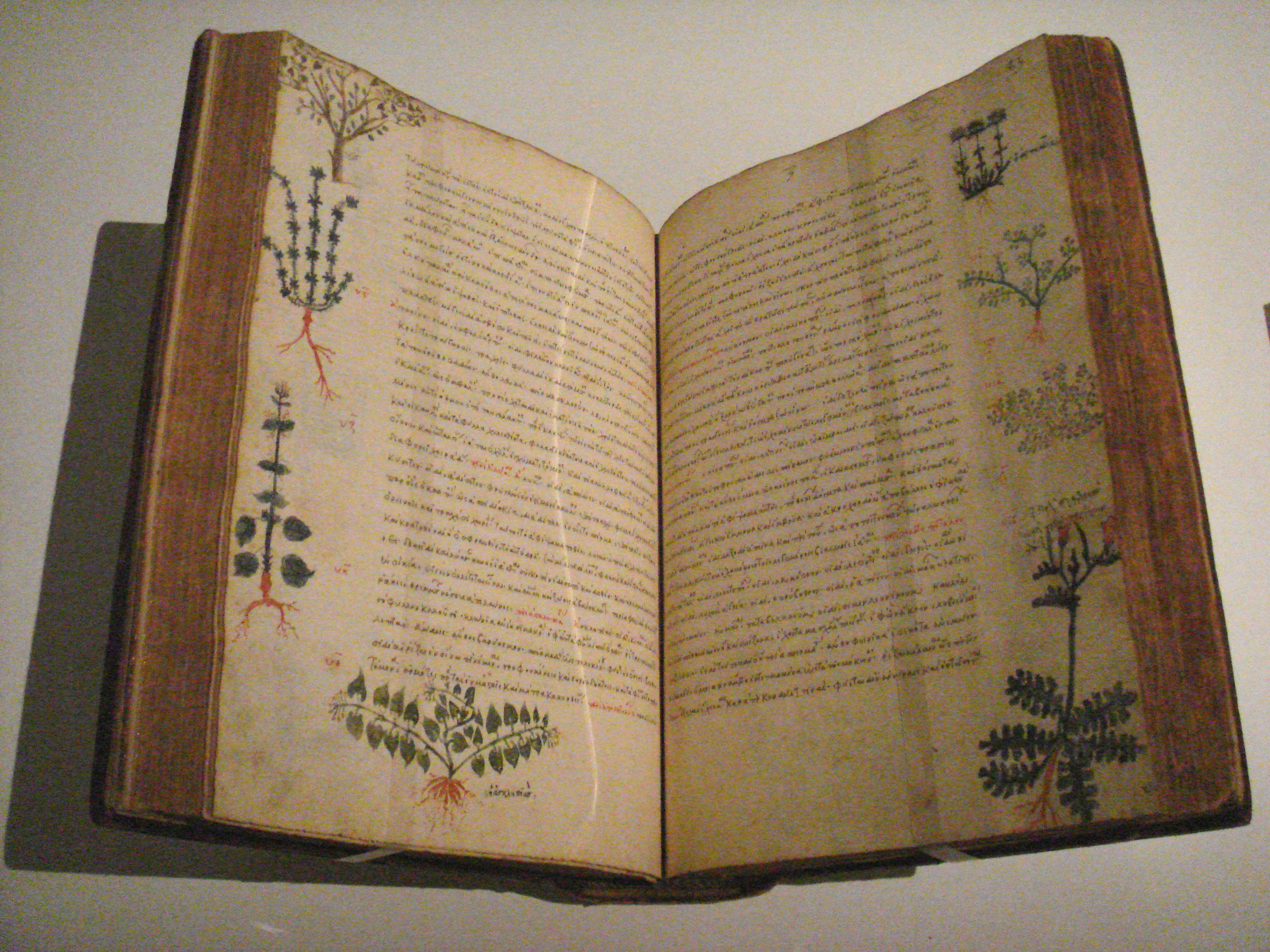
Dioscorides, De Materia Medica, Byzantium, 15th century

In Ancient Greece, there existed a separation between physician and herbalist. The duties of the herbalist was to supply physicians with raw materials, including plants, to make medicines. According to Edward Kremers and Glenn Sonnedecker, "before, during and after the time of Hippocrates there was a group of experts in medicinal plants. Probably the most important representative of these rhizotomoi was Diocles of Carystus (4th century BC). He is considered to be the source for all Greek pharmacotherapeutic treatises between the time of Theophrastus and Dioscorides."

Between 60 and 78 AD, the Greek physician Pedanius Dioscorides wrote a five-volume book, De materia medica, covering over 600 plants and coining the term materia medica. It formed the basis for many medieval texts, and was built upon by many Middle Eastern scientists during the Islamic Golden Age.

=== Asia ===
The earliest known Chinese manual on materia medica is the Shennong Ben Cao Jing (The Divine Farmer's Herb-Root Classic), dating back to the first century AD. It was compiled during the Han dynasty and was attributed to the mythical Shennong. Earlier literature included lists of prescriptions for specific ailments, exemplified by a manuscript "Recipes for 52 Ailments", found in the Mawangdui, sealed in 168 BC. Present-day Chinese pharmacy is a result of pharmaceutical exchanges between China and the rest of the world in the past centuries.

The earliest known compilation of medicinal substances in Indian traditional medicine dates to the third or fourth century AD (attributed to Sushruta, who is recorded as a physician of the sixth century BC).

There is a stone sign for a pharmacy with a tripod, a mortar, and a pestle opposite one for a doctor in the Arcadian Way in Ephesus, Turkey.

=== Japan ===
In Japan, at the end of the Asuka period (538–710) and the early Nara period (710–794), the men who fulfilled roles similar to those of modern pharmacists were highly respected. The place of pharmacists in society was expressly defined in the Taihō Code (701) and re-stated in the Yōrō Code (718). Ranked positions in the pre-Heian Imperial court were established; and this organizational structure remained largely intact until the Meiji Restoration (1868). In this highly stable hierarchy, the pharmacists—and even pharmacist assistants—were assigned status superior to all others in health-related fields such as physicians and acupuncturists. In the Imperial household, the pharmacist was even ranked above the two personal physicians of the Emperor.

== Middle Ages ==
=== Middle East ===
In Baghdad the first pharmacies, or drug stores, were established in 754, under the Abbasid Caliphate during the Islamic Golden Age. By the ninth century, these pharmacies were state-regulated.

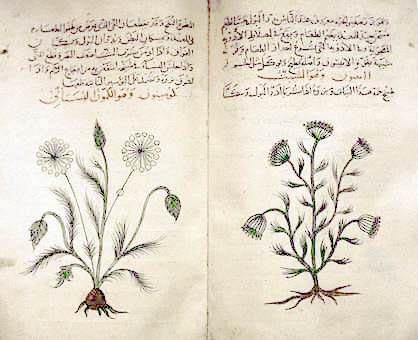
Roman herbal medicine guidebook De Materia Medica of Dioscorides. Cumin & dill. C. 1334.

The advances made in the Middle East in botany and chemistry led medicine in medieval Islam substantially to develop pharmacology. Muhammad ibn Zakarīya Rāzi (Rhazes) (865–915), for instance, acted to promote the medical uses of chemical compounds. Abu al-Qasim al-Zahrawi (Abulcasis) (936–1013) pioneered the preparation of medicines by sublimation and distillation. His Liber servitoris is of particular interest, as it provides the reader with recipes and explains how to prepare the "simples" from which were compounded the complex drugs then generally used. Shapur ibn Sahl (d. 869), was, however, the first physician to initiate a pharmacopoeia, describing a large variety of drugs and remedies for ailments. Al-Biruni (973–1050) wrote one of the most valuable Islamic works on pharmacology entitled Kitab al-Saydalah (The Book of Drugs), where he gave detailed knowledge of the properties of drugs and outlined the role of pharmacy and the functions and duties of the pharmacist.

Ibn Sina (Avicenna), too, described no less than 700 preparations, their properties, mode of action and their indications. He devoted in fact a whole volume to simple drugs in The Canon of Medicine. Of great impact were also the works by al-Maridini of Baghdad and Cairo, and Ibn al-Wafid (1008–1074), both of which were printed in Latin more than fifty times, appearing as De Medicinis universalibus et particularibus by 'Mesue' the younger, and the Medicamentis Simplicibus by 'Abenguefit'. Peter of Abano (1250–1316) translated and added a supplement to the work of al-Maridini under the title De Veneris. Al-Muwaffaq's contributions in the field are also pioneering. Living in the tenth century, he wrote The Foundations of the True Properties of Remedies, amongst others describing arsenious oxide, and being acquainted with silicic acid. He made clear distinction between sodium carbonate and potassium carbonate, and drew attention to the poisonous nature of copper compounds, especially copper vitriol, and also lead compounds. He also describes the distillation of sea-water for drinking.

Middle Eastern pharmaceutical practitioners would experience an upheaval of their craft come the beginning of the 13th and 14th centuries as pharmacists realigned their interests from developing medicinal theories to establishing practical and therapeutic applications of pharmaceuticals. For example, in 1260 CE an Egyptian Jewish physician and pharmacist named Abu ‘I-Munā al-Kuhín al-‘Attār published a 25-chapter manual, the Minhāj al-dukkān (How to run a pharmacy), wherein he documented: titles of drugs, their ingredients and quantities, preparation methods, and dosages. The manual noticeably lacks any chapters that highlight desirable characteristics and qualities aspiring physicians should display and Al Kuhín al-Attār covers very little of the ethical dilemmas or basic concepts that most pharmacists would normally discuss during this time in his manual. This demonstrates that after 1260 CE, interests lessened in discussing the culture and values surrounding pharmacy and a growing interest in developing archives of pharmacy knowledge for the public. It is worth mentioning that written manuals were not commonly produced by pharmacists in the Middle East. It is also during the 13th and 14th centuries that Middle Eastern pharmacopoeias begin to resemble cookbooks more than medical encyclopedias, which Thomas Allsen attributes to the extensive cultural exchange between China, Iran, and the greater Mongol Empire.

=== Europe ===
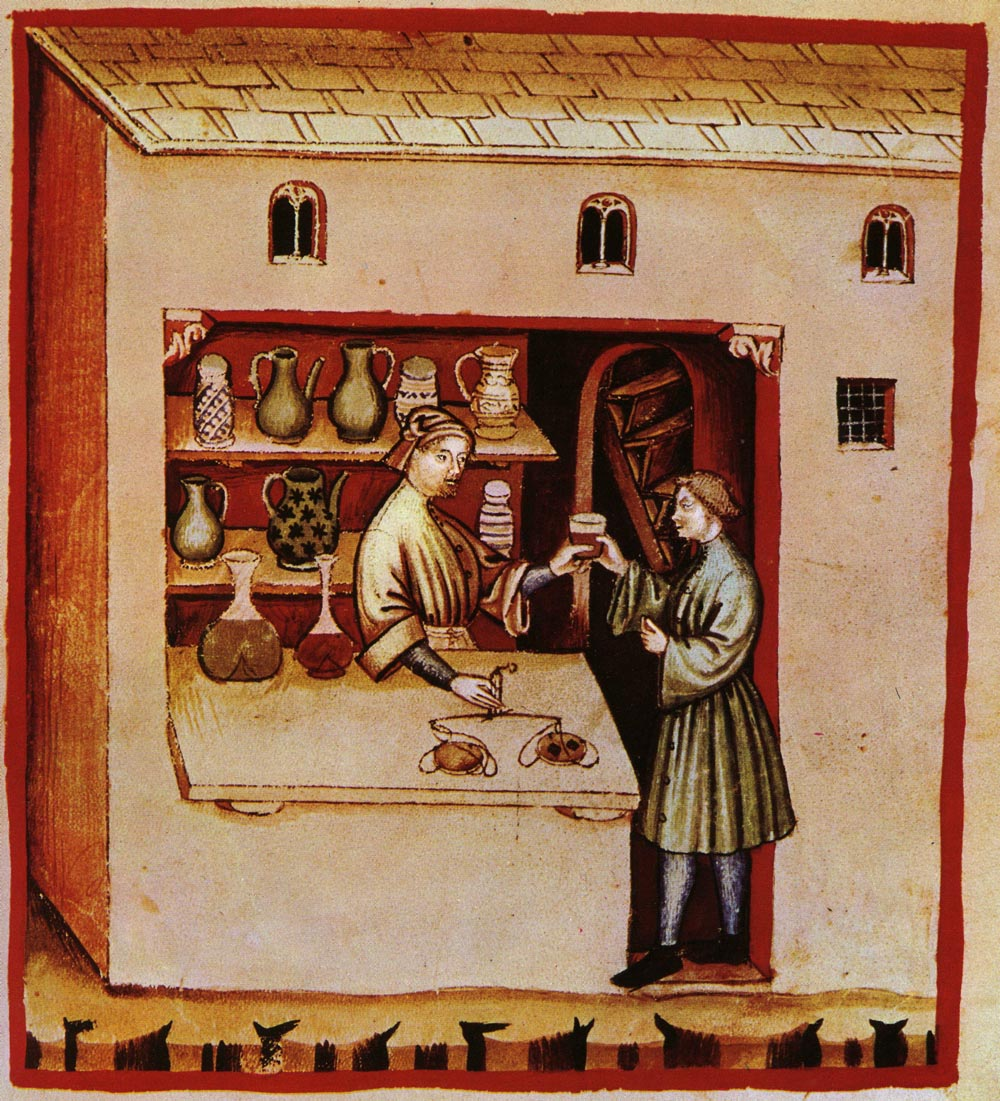
Illustration of a pharmacy in the Italian Tacuinum sanitatis, 14th century

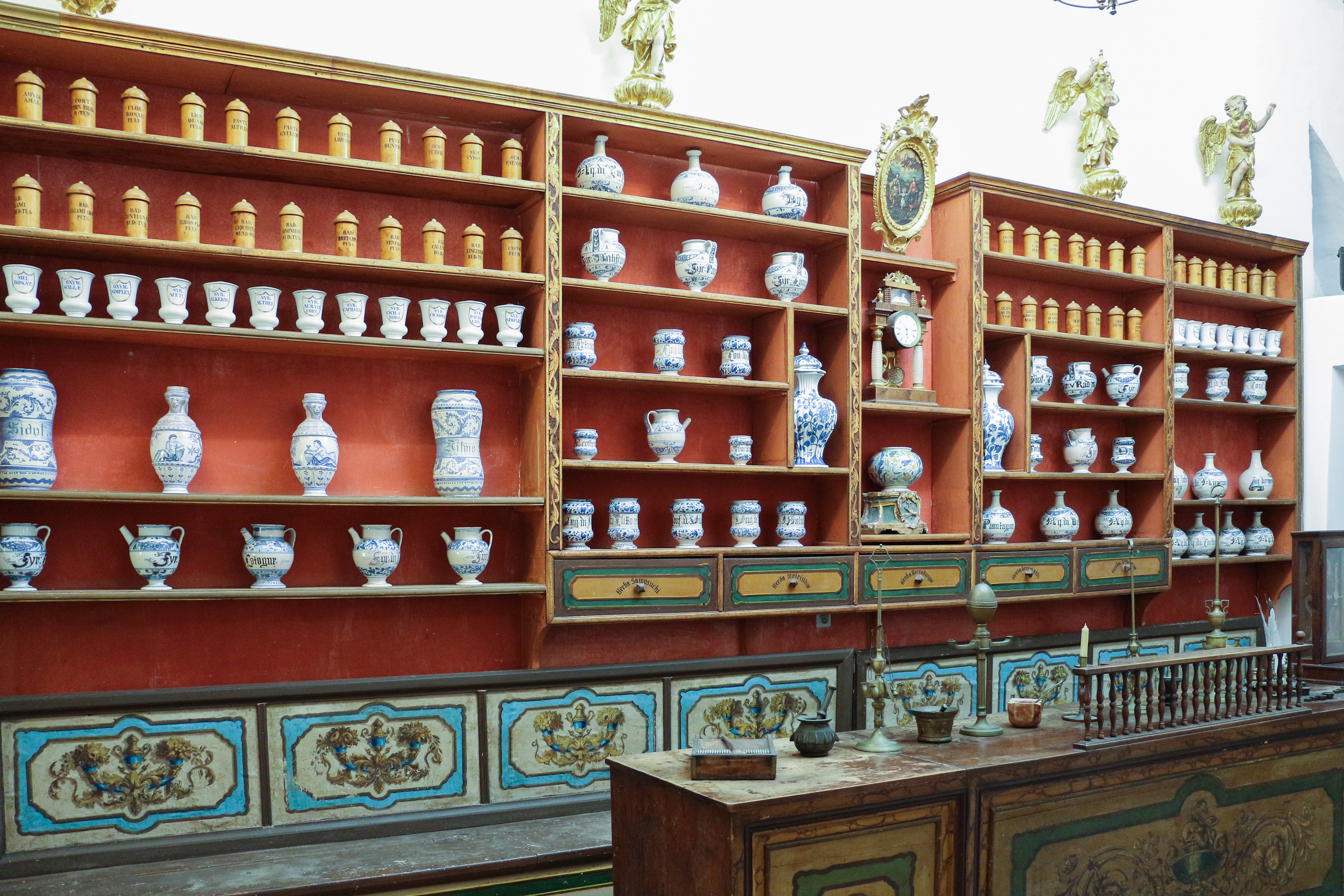
Old pharmacy in the Franciscan Monastery, Dubrovnik

After the fifth century fall of the Western Roman Empire, medicinal knowledge in Europe suffered due to the loss of Greek medicinal texts and a strict adherence to tradition, although an area of Southern Italy near Salerno remained under Byzantine control and developed a hospital and medical school, which became famous by the 11th century.

In the early 11th century, Salerno scholar Constantinos Africanus translated many Arabic books into Latin, driving a shift from Hippocratic medicine towards a pharmaceutical-driven approach advocated by Galen. In medieval Europe, monks typically did not speak Greek, leaving only Latin texts such as the works of Pliny available until these translations by Constantinos. In addition, Arabic medicine became more widely known due to Muslim Spain.

In the 15th century, the printing press spread medicinal textbooks and formularies; the Antidotarium was the first printed drug formulary.

In Europe pharmacy-like shops began to appear during the 12th century. In 1240 emperor Frederic II issued a decree by which the physician's and the apothecary's professions were separated.

Old pharmacies continue to operate in Dubrovnik, Croatia located inside the Franciscan monastery, opened in 1317. The Town Hall Pharmacy in Tallinn, Estonia, which dates back to at least 1422, is the oldest continuously run pharmacy in the world still operating in the original premises.

The trend towards pharmacy specialization started to take effect in Bruges, Belgium where a new law was passed that forbid physicians to prepare medications for patients.

The oldest pharmacy is claimed to be set up in 1221 in the Church of Santa Maria Novella in Florence, Italy, which now houses a perfume museum. Florence is also the birthplace of the first official pharmacopeia, called the Nuovo Receptario, which all pharmacies use as guidance for caring for the sickly.

The Royal College of Apothecaries of the City and Kingdom of Valencia was founded in 1441, considered the oldest in the world, with full administrative and legislative powers. The apothecaries of Valencia were the first in the world to elaborate their medicines, with the same criteria that are currently required in the official pharmacopoeias.

The Republic of Venice was the first State with health policies which requires that the nature of the drug is public. In actuality, thirteen secrets survive which were offered to sale to the Venetian Republic.

== Industrialization ==
The 1800s brought increased technical sophistication. By the late 1880s, German dye manufacturers had perfected the purification of individual organic compounds from tar and other mineral sources and had also established rudimentary methods in organic chemical synthesis.

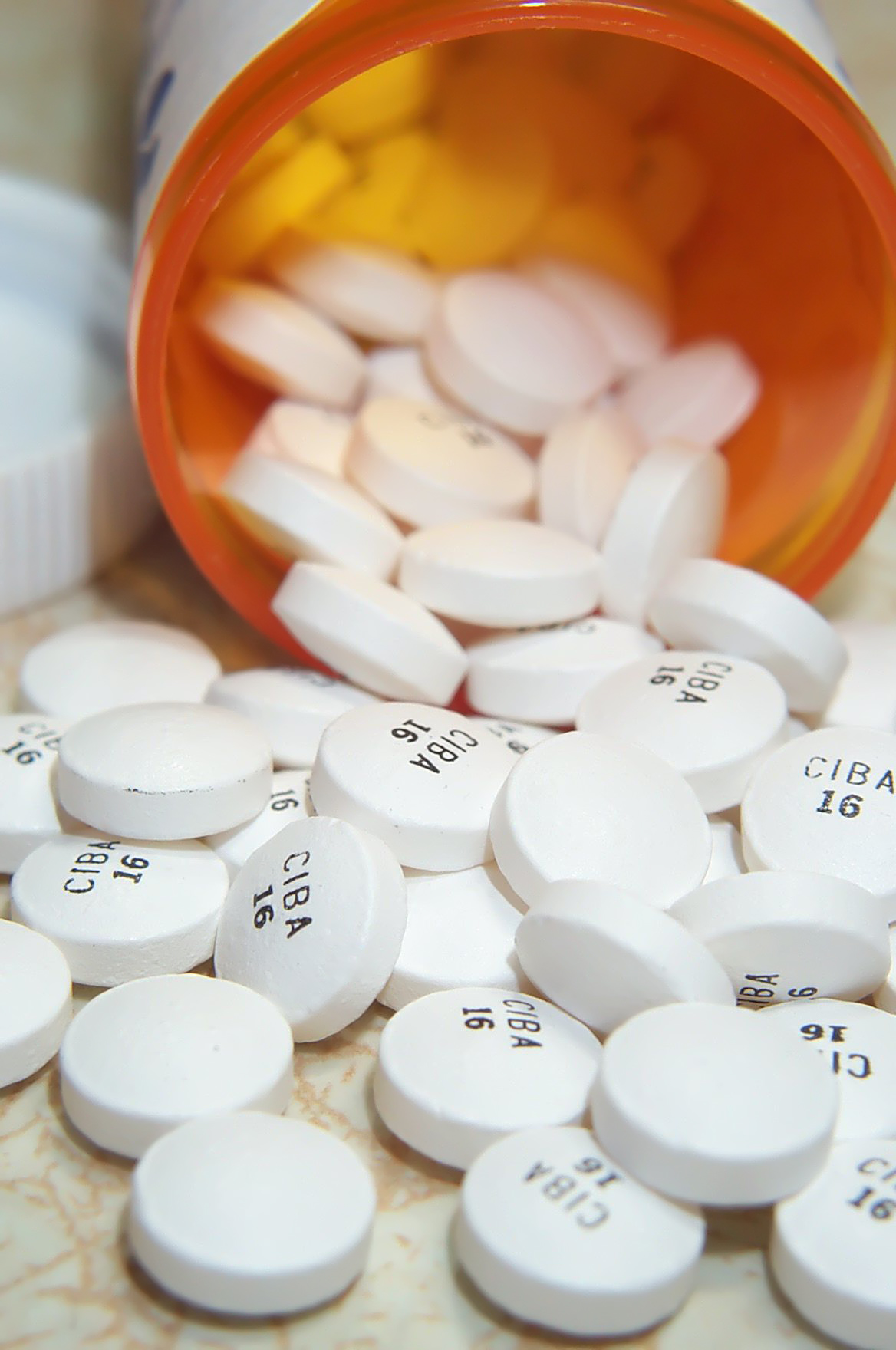

Chloral hydrate was introduced as a sleeping aid and sedative in 1869. Chloroform was first used as an anesthetic in 1847.

Derivatives of phenothiazines had an important impact on various aspects of medicine, beginning with methylene blue which was originally used as a dye after its synthesis from aniline in 1876. Phenothiazines were used as antimalarials, antiseptics, and antihelminthics up to 1940. The "psychopharmacological revolution" began in 1950 when Chlorpromazine was discovered.

The United States formed the American Pharmaceutical Association in 1852 with its main purpose to advance pharmacists' roles in patient care, assist in furthering career development, spread information about tools and resources, and raising awareness about the roles of pharmacists and their contribution to patient care.

Frederick Banting and Charles Best found the hormone insulin to lower blood sugar of dogs in 1921. This inspired further work by James Collip who developed pure insulin used for human testing and dramatically changed the prospects for all diabetics.

In 1928 Alexander Fleming developed the first antibiotic, penicillin, after discovering a fungus that was able to kill off bacteria.

== Late Modern Period ==
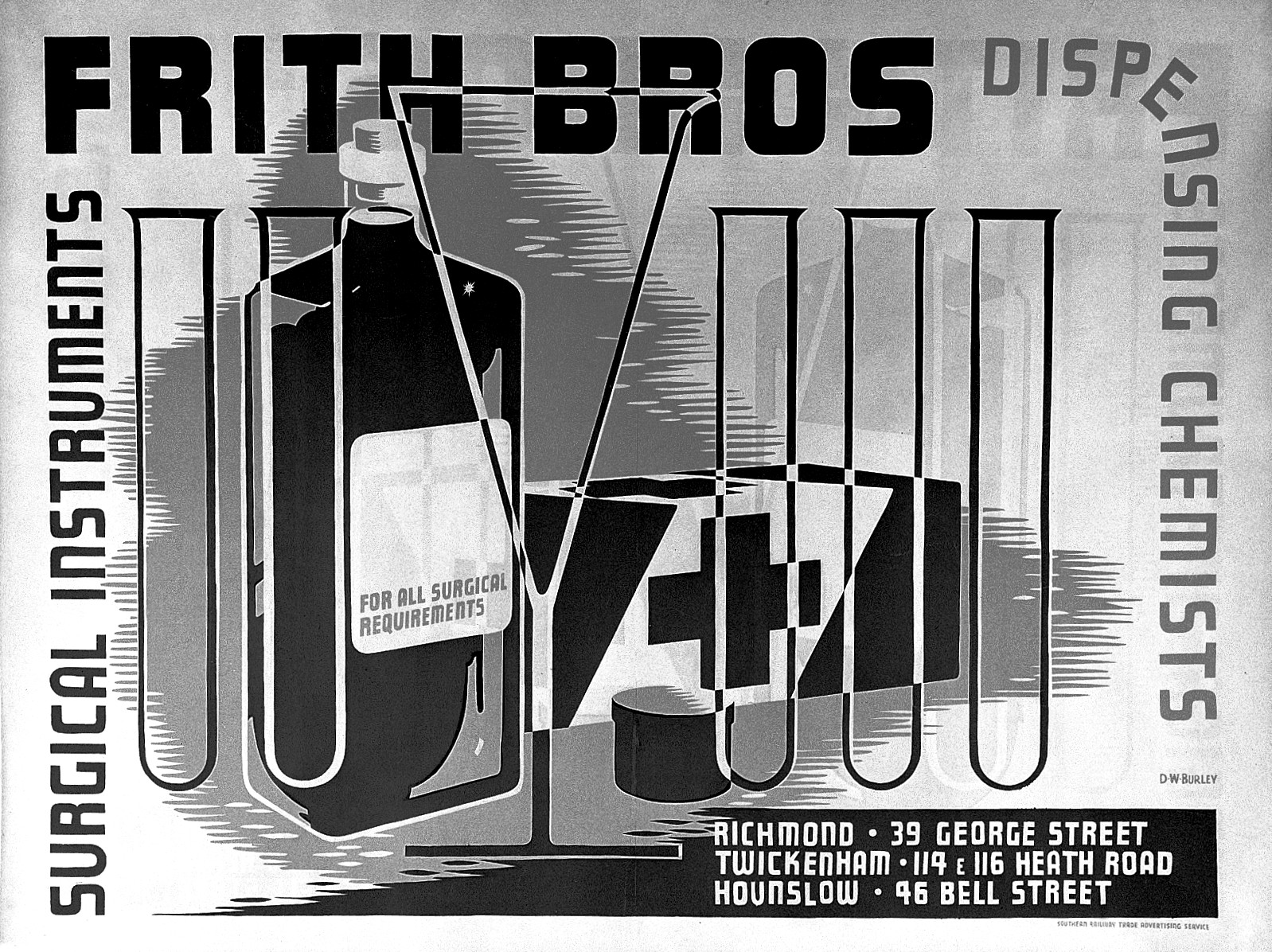
Medical and pharmaceutical equipment advertising from the Wellcome Collection (1930s)

=== Singapore ===
The first pharmaceutical infrastructure was the Medical Stores and Dispensary, organized by Sub-Assistant Surgeon Thomas Prendergast during Raffles' expedition to Singapore. British settlement in Singapore led to establishing three General Hospitals. Two were for military and sailors respectively, while the last one was for civilian use.

Medical staffing were ranked as Senior Surgeon, Assistant Surgeon, and Apothecaries. Apothecaries were medical subordinates; they were doctors that graduated from Indian Medical Colleges. To support staffing shortages at the General Hospital, a proposal to select local male students from Penang Free School to become assistant apothecaries were approved. The proposal outlined five years of training and rigorous requirements to be qualified as an apprenticeship. Those that complete the apprenticeship not only experienced strict expectations and responsibilities, but also little pay. Apothecaries resigned and left for private practice. Private practices heavily advertised in newspapers. This was considered the first system of pharmacy operations.

James Isaiah (J.I.) Woodford founded the Kampong Glam Dispensary. Another company was Martin & Line of the Singapore Dispensary. Both establishments were considered as chemists and druggists. In addition to traditional Chinese medicine, Western medicine and practices were also established. Dr. Christopher Trebing arrived in Singapore and opened a dispensary called German Medicine Deity Medical Office. Following Dr. Trebing’s passing, the Medical Office continued to be operated by German owners until its demolition in 1970.

Singaporean consumers suffered from misinformation of drug advertisements and lacked standards and qualifications for dispensing drugs. There was also substance abuse with opium and poison accessibility for criminal attempt. This led to creating the Medical Ordinance in 1904 and Poisons Ordinance in 1905 to create standards for qualified chemists and druggists to handle these substances. The Poisons Ordinance established regulation for the retail of poisons. One criterion was possessing certificates from the Principal Civil Medical Officer. In the same year, King Edward VII College of Medicine was established. The Medical School hosted classes and exams for the pharmacy certificate.

Throughout the twentieth century, the government amended its ordinances for education and licensing. These early legal efforts led to Ordinance No. 30 of 1933. The ordinance formally required training and registration for pharmacists after training. King Edward VII College of Medicine admitted its first pharmacy students in 1935.

== See also ==
- International Society for the History of Pharmacy
- British Society for the History of Pharmacy
- History of medicine
- History of pharmacy automation
- History of pharmacy in the United States
- List of drugs by year of discovery
- Museum of the History of Lithuanian Medicine and Pharmacy
