= History of pharmacy in the United States =

The history of pharmacy in the United States is the story of a melting pot of new pharmaceutical ideas and innovations drawn from advancements that Europeans shared, Native American medicine and newly discovered medicinal plants in the New World. American pharmacy grew from this fertile mixture, and has impacted U.S. history, and the global course of pharmacy.

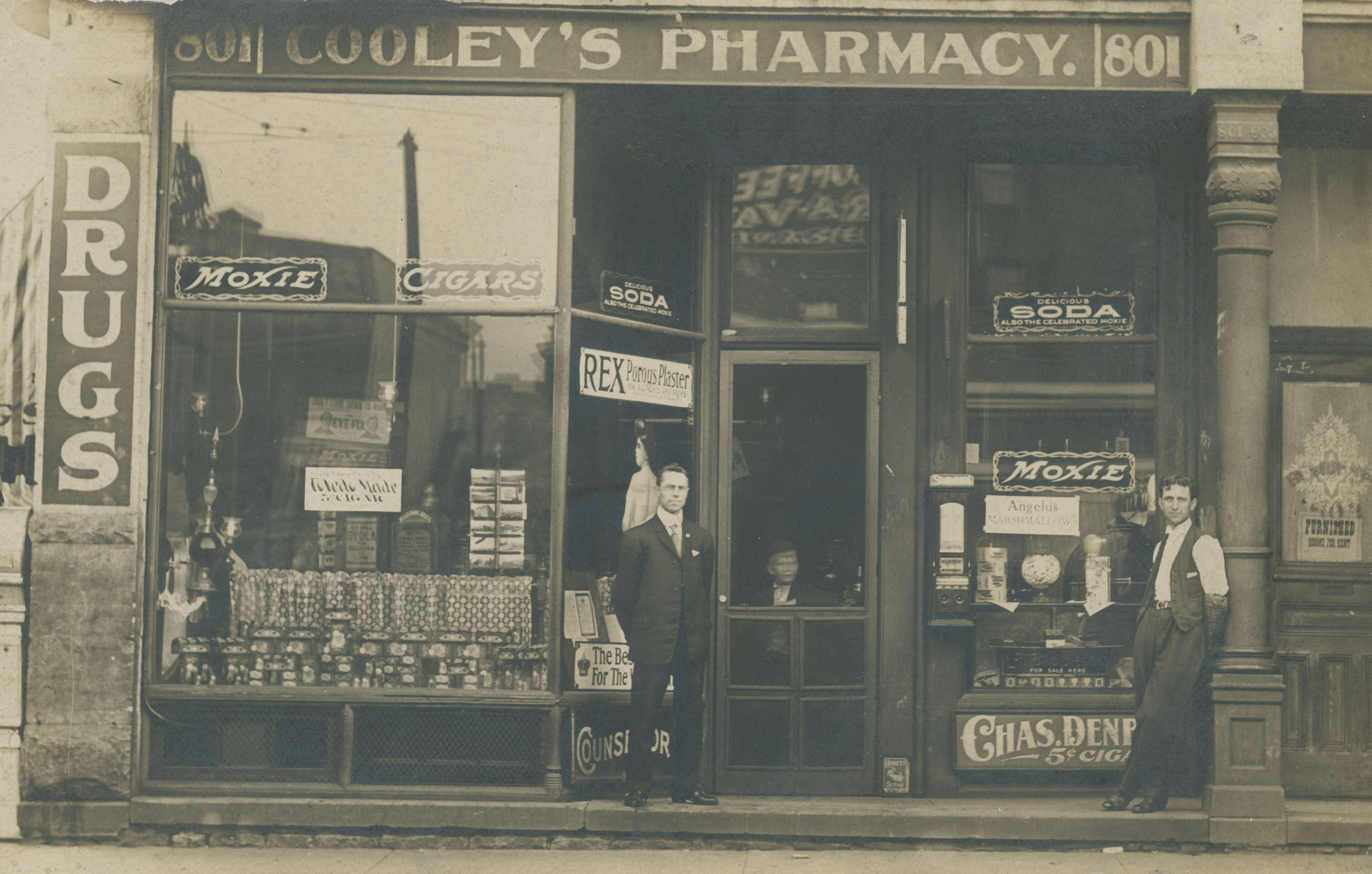
Cooley Pharmacy, Toledo, Ohio c. 1900

Apothecary—an ancient title that, especially in pre-modern or early modern contexts, indicates a broader set of skills and duties than the core role of dispensing medications, like prescribing remedies and even giving some treatments difficult to self-administer, e.g. enemas—have largely been within the "pharmacist" umbrella in the U.S. since the mid-19th century, when Edward Parrish of the American Pharmaceutical Association successfully proposed that the APhA "consider all the varied pharmaceutical practitioners 'pharmacists'” to better "standardize the field." Unlike in the UK, where pharmacists were separated from apothecaries by Parliament and the pharmacist had effectively eclipsed the ancient apothecary, appellations and professions have been far more fluid and overlapping in the U.S., especially prior to the regulatory schemes widely adopted in the late 19th century. "Apothecary" still crops up as synonym for pharmacist, along with "druggist," and has yet to fall entirely out of use, with some in the U.S. still calling themselves apothecaries. As the pharmacist increasingly became the distinct discipline and tightly defined profession it is today, American pharmacists added their own discoveries and innovations, and played a prominent role in the revolution in medical knowledge in the 19th and 20th centuries and the subsequent development of modern medicine.

The history of pharmacy has lagged behind other fields in the history of science and medicine, perhaps because primary sources in the field are sparse. Historical inquiries in this area have been few, and unlike the growing number of programs in the history of medicine, history of pharmacy programs remain few in number in the United States.

== Colonial period ==
=== Early developments alongside colonization ===
As soon as Columbus started his explorations of the Americas in the late 15th century, a European effort to find valuable medicinal plants among the flora of the New World to add to the medical canon got underway. Early New World medicines uncovered included guaiacum from the West Indies (for coughs, rheumatism and a wide variety of other uses), sassafras from Florida, copaiba from Brazil, Peru balsam and, most famously, cinchona bark from Peru, also called "Jesuit's bark" in honor of its discoverer, which became the first effective treatment for malaria. The active ingredient of this cinchona bark, quinine, was the primary treatment for malaria well into the 1940s. "About 170 drugs used by the Indians of British North America, and perhaps 50 used by the indigenous people of the Caribbean, Mexico, Central and South America" became important enough in the U.S. (as the practitioners of chemistry and pharmacy eventually catalogued, analyzed and understood them) to merit listing in the United States Pharmacopoeia (est. 1820) or the National Formulary.

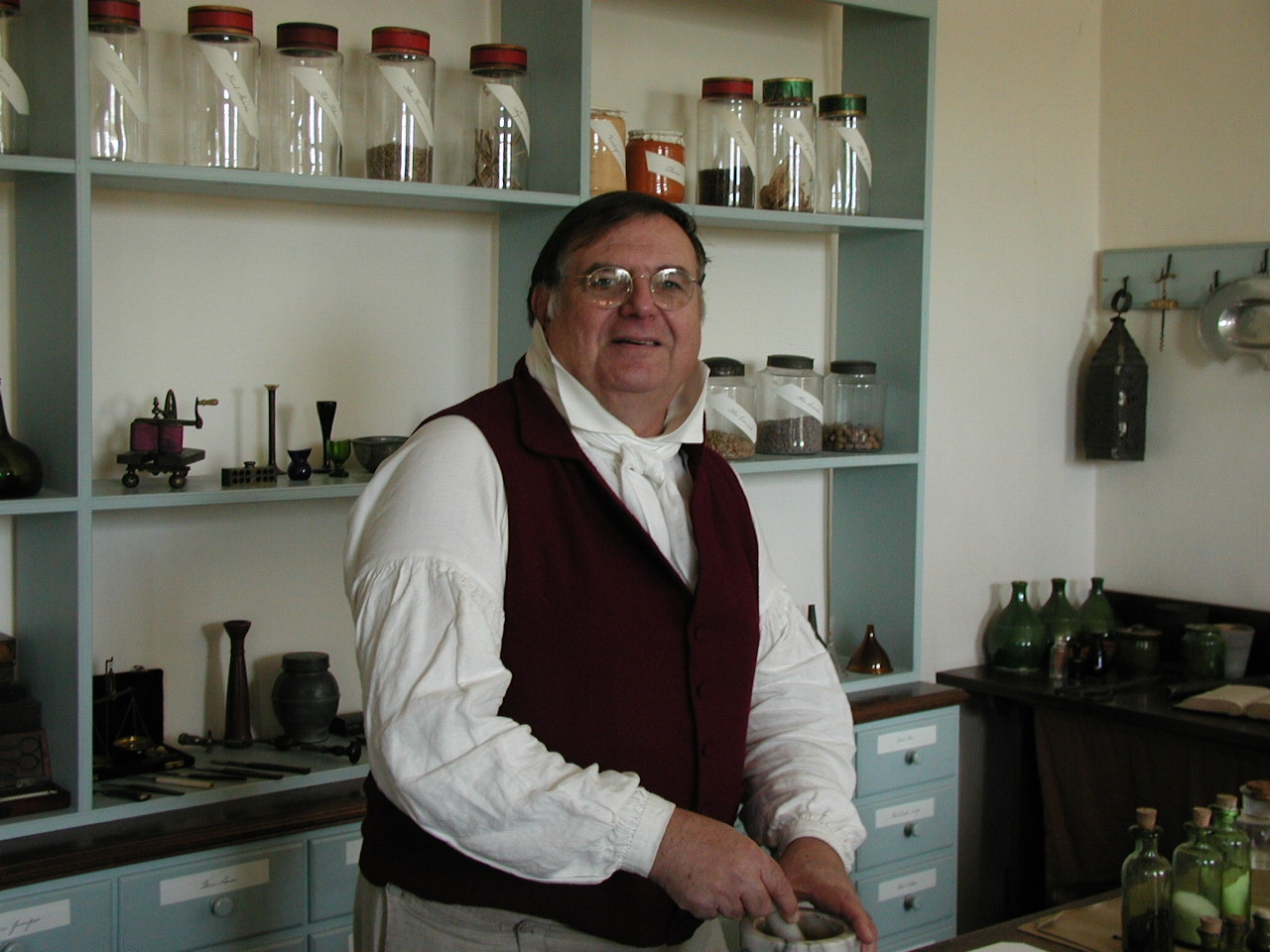
A living historian interprets a 19th-century apothecary shop for visitors, Old Salem, North Carolina.

In the early 1700s, James Oglethorpe, founder of the Georgia colony, with the financial backing of the Worshipful Society of Apothecaries of London and others, launched an effort to identify and transplant beneficial plant species from the tropical colonies to Savannah, Georgia. Unfortunately for Oglethorpe (and all the Southern colonists) the expedition that marked this first attempt by an organized group of Old World apothecaries to benefit from British North America's potential as a medicine farm never bore fruit. The Caribbean expedition's lead investigator, botanist Robert Miller, was hampered by illness and uncooperative Spanish colonials, and all support from London ceased when Miller died without much success.

=== Pharmacy in eighteenth-century North America ===
The first "drugstores" in North America "appeared in Bethlehem, Pennsylvania, Boston, New York, and Philadelphia," with likely proto-drugstores—for example Gysbert van Imbroch ran a "general store" that sold drugs from 1663 to 1665 in Wildwyck, New Netherland, today's Kingston, New York—preceding the dedicated apothecary shops of the 1700s, and providing a model. Because of that model, and customs that stretch back to the first apothecary shops in the medieval Arab world most drugstores continued selling more general goods, perfumes, cosmetics, and drinks of all sorts alongside medicines, and still do.

==== Non-British influences ====
That the Spanish colonials, not the British, were the first in North America to license a pharmacist (in 1769 in New Orleans) and were also the first to regulate pharmacy as a separate profession, points to the importance of non-British colonial governments and, indeed, settlers from mainland Europe throughout North America, in importing and translating the more modern pharmacy methods, standards and ways of organization and regulation—developing in Europe since at least the 1600s—for application in the infant United States.

"Franco-Spanish" Louisiana "more clearly reflected [pharmacy's] development in Continental Europe." Influential milestones achieved in 18th-century Louisiana included the February 12th, 1770 edict from the governor in New Orleans, Don Alexandre O'Reilly, delineating the responsibilities and boundaries of medicine, surgery and pharmacy and marking the first legal recognition of pharmacy as a distinct discipline in the territories that would become the United States. Though the number of pharmacists licensed under this system in Spanish Louisiana never surpassed the single-digits, O'Reilly's decree and its ethical code for pharmacists set an important precedent future developments would build upon. It also brought on-line an important independent pipeline of licensed druggists, albeit a small pipeline, to add to the scant supply of Old World apothecaries who had immigrated to set up shop in the colonies.

Of the few apothecaries imported from Europe, those of Jesuit training had a long-felt impact in both New Spain and New France; so great was Jesuit involvement in "care of the sick" in their foreign missions, in fact, they sought and received a papal exemption from the ban on clerics serving in medical roles. Two dedicated "pharmacopoles or apothecary brethren" Jesuits are listed under the heading "Missions of North America in New France" in Society of Jesus personnel records for the "Province of France at the End of the Year 1749." Jesuit contributions, especially in translating Native American ethnobotany into medicines for European use, were highly influential as pharmacy developed in North America.

==== In British North America ====
Pharmacist Ambrose Hunsberger, in his sweeping introduction covering pharmacy's development in the United States prior to the events discussed in his 1923 article on Prohibition's impact, "The Practice of Pharmacy Under the Volstead Act," described pharmacy before its organization (which he places around 1821) in terms that evoke the snake oil salesmen and medicine shows that hit every town, hamlet and village in the country: "...the disorganized system of hawking medicinal remedies which prevailed throughout our thinly populated country. There was no method of protecting the public from fraud through control or regulation of the sale of adulterated and harmful medicinal products, and the credulous citizenry of the young nation was beguiled by every description of fakir and charlatan into buying their fantastic panaceas." Hunsberger puts the practice of "more or less methodical" pharmacy in Europe "two or three centuries" back, as early as the 16th or 17th century, whereas he places the start of organized pharmacy in the United States with the founding of America's first formal college of pharmacy, the Philadelphia College of Pharmacy (PCP), in 1821.

Prior to this, however, the original British colonies retained a much more ad hoc, improvisational approach to pharmacy, and "there were, as was to be expected in a land so vast and so sparsely settled, virtually no limitations as to where or by whom pharmacy could be practiced." Lines between the professions of pharmacist, wholesale druggist and physician did not yet exist in the way they would later; "their provinces overlapped, and appellations, which often meant little, frequently changed."

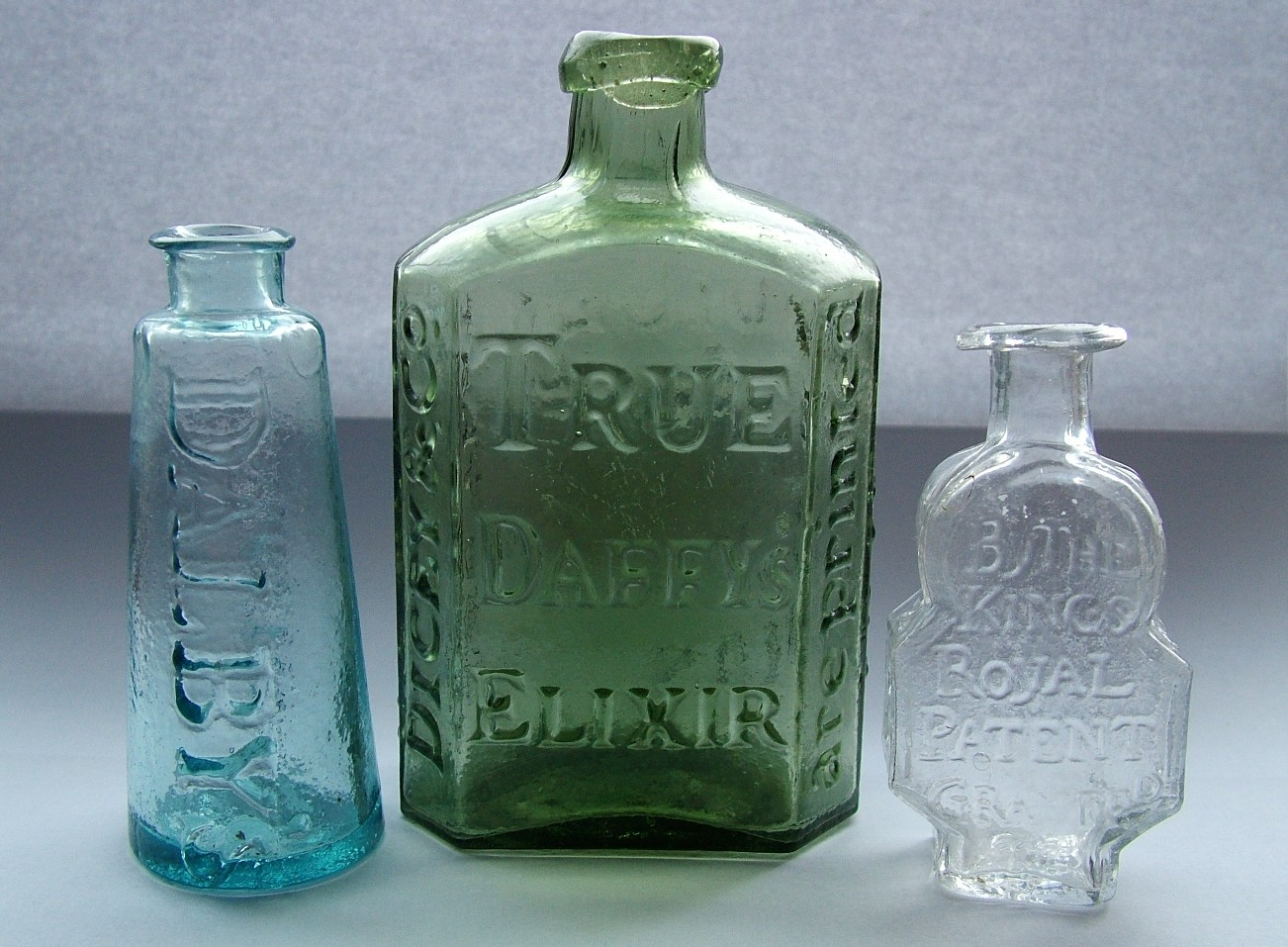
Dicey and Co.'s True Daffy's Elixir, its 18th century-type embossed medicine bottle seen here (center), was one of the more popular examples of the patent medicines Americans imported from across the Atlantic in the 18th and 19th centuries.

In the colonial and early independence years, necessity demanded a do-it-yourself approach to pharmacy. "Most, if not all, American medical men prepared and dispensed their own medications, since fee bills and custom usually provided fees for the medication and not the visit, unless surgery or delivery was involved." Thus, oftentimes the doctor was the apothecary and the apothecary the doctor, especially among rural "country doctors" who predominated in this era of farmers with "freeholds" thinly dotting the colonies. "Even in the 1760s, when a younger and largely native born cohort of physicians returned from Europe, most of the reputable and even famous among the American medici ran their own pharmaceutical business," which, for most doctors for the bulk of the 18th century included mostly medications mixed and dispensed by hand, sometimes augmented with a supply of patent medicines imported from the UK or mainland Europe.

In the cities, the foundations of commercial pharmacy were slowly building. By 1721 there were "14 apothecary shops in Boston," and the first "commissioned pharmaceutical officer in an American army" was the Boston apothecary, Andrew Craigie. A sort of warrior-apothecary, he took part in the Battle of Bunker Hill, June 17, 1775. And "when Congress reorganized the Medical Department of the Army in 1777, Craigie became the first Apothecary General."

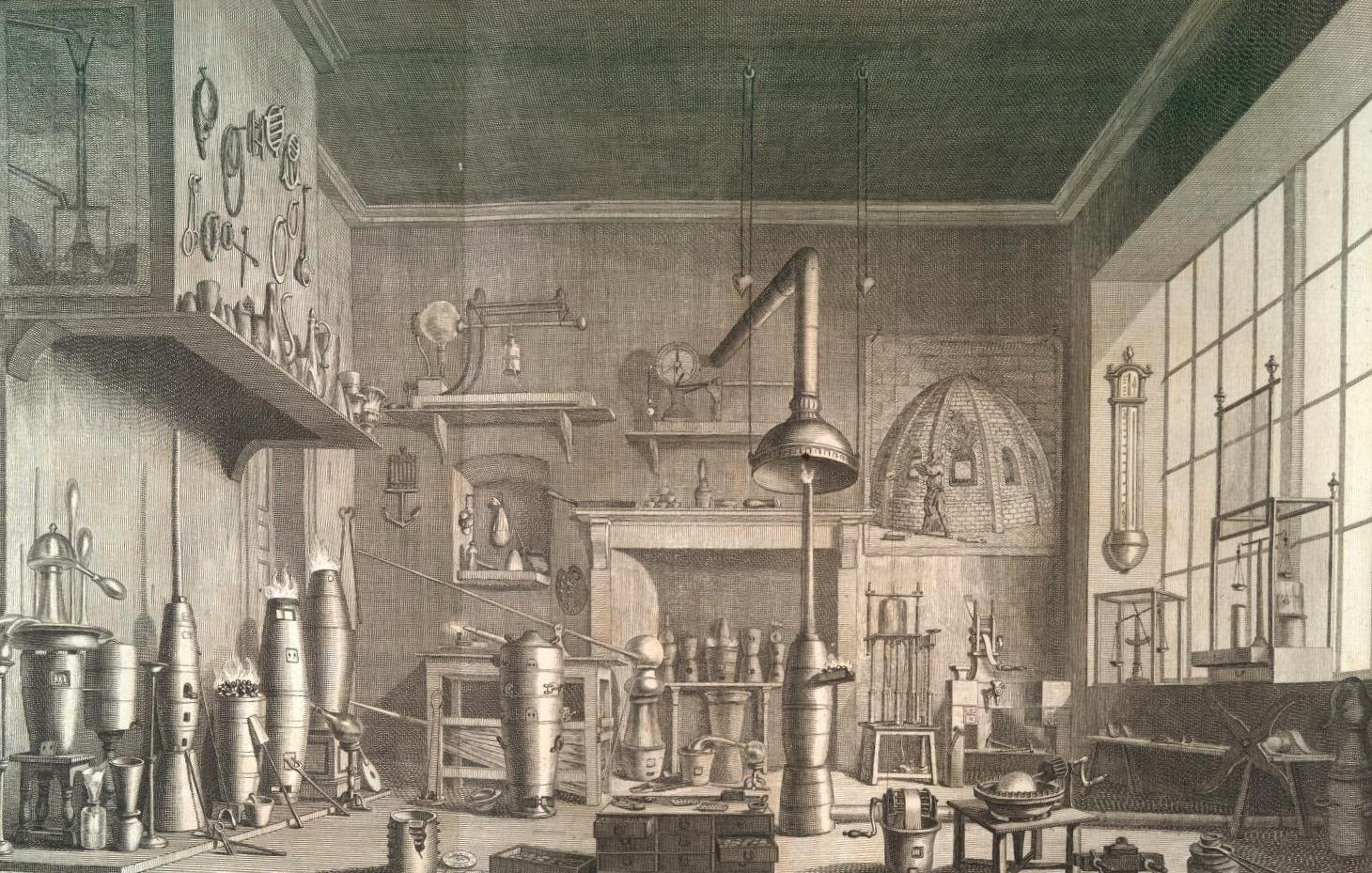
An engraving depicting an 18th-century chemical laboratory, from William Lewis' later work Commercium Philosophico-Technicum (mid-1760s)

Important early American "apothecary shops" include the one in colonial Fredericksburg run by later-brigadier general in the Continental Army, Hugh Mercer, (the building is now a museum, and has been "scientifically dated" to 1771 or 1772). And the Marshall Apothecary (established 1729, open for 96 years) in Philadelphia, which was a manufacturer of medicines as well as a retailer, and served as an important supplier throughout the Revolutionary War. Advertisements from the period indicate "that there were drugstores in virtually all American cities by the end of the eighteenth century."

Economic historian Bernice Hamilton describes the 1700s as having "completely transformed" all "the medical professions," explaining that "advances in medical education and science," the emergence of a robust middle class, "as well as the growth of 'a professional feeling'" had greatly changed the socio-economic order by the end of the 18th century. Thanks to the ruling in the Rose Case back in London, apothecaries began 1705 as fully accredited medical professionals who could write prescriptions. Hamilton notes "…the apothecaries, once mere tradesmen and the 'servants of the physician,' had become practicing doctors," treating patients directly. These trends spread to the colonies, and though apothecaries never organized into a legally distinct and guilded profession in North America, the rural hinterlands mirrored the prevalence of the apothecary in Britain, where "in more remote locales, the apothecary 'was usually the only doctor.'"

The pharmacopoeia, which simply lists useful drugs—or sometimes more importantly, drops questionable substances from the canon—"came fully into its own in the early modern age", encompassing roughly the span of history covering the 1500s up until the French Revolutions in the late 1700s. But pharmacopoeias mainly offered some basics and compounding instructions.

Not until the first dispensatories were there books disseminating more comprehensive information on pharmaceuticals: guidance on uses for drugs, how and in what situations to employ them, experience with best practices, etc. "This kind of book, the dispensatory, became something of a British specialty in the late seventeenth and eighteenth century." These dispensatories, chief among them William Lewis' The New Dispensatory, which debuted in 1753 and was regarded as "the first truly scientific work on pharmacy in the English language," along with a later (1786) book intended as "'an improvement' on Lewis," the Edinburgh New Dispensatory, were undoubtedly formative for pharmacy in British North America. The New Dispensatory and Edinburgh New Dispensatory were printed in many editions and numerous languages within their lifespans (1753–1830) including six printings for American use between them.'

== The 19th century: American pharmacy emerges ==
The 19th century (1800s) birthed "pharmacy as we know it." And again, pharmacy's development in mainland Europe continued to fuel its growth in the young American republic.

=== The Philadelphia College of Pharmacy and the birth of organized American pharmacy ===
The Philadelphia College of Pharmacy (PCP), modeled—at least in concept—after the Collége de pharmacie in Paris, was aided by European talent in its early, formative years. Elias Durand, who had served as "pharmacien of the Grand Army of Napoleon I," set up shop in Philadelphia in 1825, and "...in connection with the Philadelphia College of Pharmacy, immediately exerted a strong foreign influence on American pharmacy." According to William Procter, Jr., Durand "directly and indirectly had much to do with the introduction of scientific pharmacy into Philadelphia." Without teaching at the college, Durand still had a big impact by spreading new findings about medicinal plants, making "medicinal chemicals" never before created in the U.S., by training apprentices, like Augustine Duhamel, who went on to make important contributions and publish in the college journal, and by serving as a role model for foundational figures like Procter.

Hunsberger cites the founding of the Philadelphia College of Pharmacy (PCP) as "the first step forward in the development of a system of pharmaceutical practice in the United States," with the 1821 "meeting of apothecaries...held in Carpenters' Hall" (where the Continental Association had been signed) to set up the first formal college of pharmacy and first pharmacists' association (the Philadelphia College of Pharmacy) in North America the seminal founding event. On March 13, 1821, "Sixty-eight pharmacists signed the Constitution of the first pharmaceutical association in the United States," with the symbolism of the Carpenters' Hall backdrop undeniable: American pharmacy would have a constitution, following in the footsteps of the Founding Fathers and their constitutional framework. The PCP constitution included a strict code of ethics that would expel anyone from the college who "adulterated" medications or knowingly sold "articles of that character," and provided for a "committee of inspection" to verify the purity, safety and effectiveness of medicines, and a "committee of equity" to arbitrate disputes between member pharmacists. The college, which was founded as an association to advance the discipline of pharmacy not just a university, quickly became a game-changer: in 1824 they published "carefully determined formulas" for the fabrication of (formerly) "secret-formula" patent medicines previously imported from the UK, an essential step toward self-sufficient pharmaceutical manufacturing in the U.S.

The Philadelphia College of Pharmacy also aided the rise of the American Pharmaceutical Association (APhA), which formed at a founding convention congregated in the Hall of the College, October 6 to 8, 1852. Daniel B. Smith, who had long been the PCP's president—ultimately from 1829 to 1854—was elected the APhA's first president at the founding convention, and William Procter, Jr. the first secretary.

==== The "Father of American Pharmacy" ====
William Procter, Jr., who graduated from, then taught at the Philadelphia College of Pharmacy for 20 years, went on to exert so much influence over the formative years of professional pharmacy that he's now widely considered the "Father of American Pharmacy." Procter successfully argued for the establishment of a chair of Pharmacy for pharmacist-professors at the PCP in 1844, then wrote "the first American pharmacy textbook," which came to be known as Mohr, Redwood, and Procter's Practical Pharmacy (1849). The book was not commercially successful, but became a model for subsequent "works of long-lived popularity: Edward Parrish's An Introduction to Practical Pharmacy (1855-1884), and Joseph P. Remington's Practice of Pharmacy (1888-1995 [19th ed.])". Procter also led the American Journal of Pharmacy for 22 years, served 30 years on the U.S.P. Revision Committee, where he did much to improve the U.S. Pharmacopeia, and following five years as the American Pharmaceutical Association's corresponding secretary, he became the APhA's president, leading delegations of American pharmacists in conferences with their counterparts offshore. At the Second International Congress of Pharmacy in Paris, France, August 21 to 24, 1867, Procter argued forcefully against the "compulsory limitation of pharmacies" (capping their number in a given city or province) under consideration, telling the assembled delegates that, in the U.S., "there is not the slightest obstacle toward a multiplication of drug stores save that a lack of success" and that the American public is "a forceful agent of reform" to keep unscrupulous operators in check. Procter's declaration was later seen as a defining statement of "the American Way of Pharmacy."

==== Pharmacy schools and professional organizations spread ====
Other major cities on the Eastern Seaboard followed Philadelphia's lead, establishing university training programs, professional associations and colleges of pharmacy that acted as professional associations like the PCP. New York City was among the quickest to follow suit with the New York College of Pharmacy, established 1829.

As this 1851 notice from the New York Daily Times exemplifies, pharmacy schools (here the New York College of Pharmacy) often were acting as professional associations, or at least promoted pharmacist education and the distinct profession of pharmacist with a guild-like zeal, with this article advertising training for "those who desire to qualify themselves thoroughly as Apothecaries" while calling out "inferior druggists" and cautioning that "community ought not to be indifferent" to the character and motives of druggists who "stand aloof from the College." Note the use of the term "druggists" to denote medication providers who are not trained pharmacists, while the term "apothecary" is still used as positive synonym.

==== 1860 The first Pharmacists arrive on the west coast of America in the newly formed state of California ====
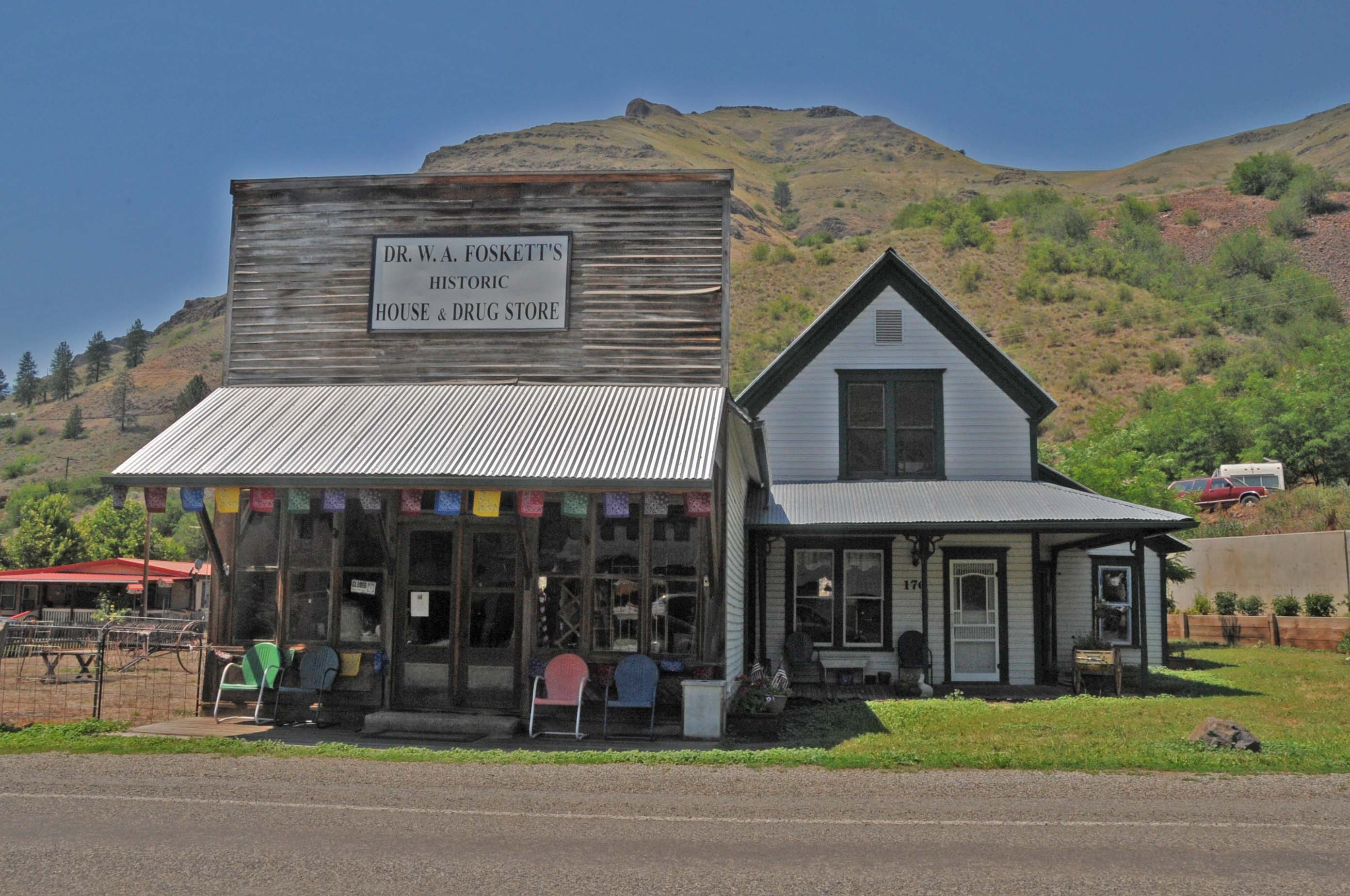
The Dr. Wilson Foskett Home and Drugstore, opened c. 1897 and now a registered National Historic Place in Idaho County, Idaho, shows how pharmaceutical businesses run by a doctor in conjunction with their medical practice, a ubiquitous feature of medicine in 1700s North America, persisted in more rural areas during the 19th century, sometimes even into the 20th century.

Although the "modern" form of pharmacy was well into its development by the beginning of the 1800s on the east coast and other areas to the west of America, it would take several decades until 1847 before America would finally have control over the furthest south-western continental territories. Although there were several legitimate American doctors in Los Angeles by 1850, none of whom had studied or held degrees in the pharmaceutical sciences, in particular (pharmaceutical formulation) but nonetheless subsequently functioned as "druggist" and as an interesting side note, almost all of whom were not primarily doctors as a main occupation but had other main forms of livelihoods. In ca. 1854 one such case, and also one of the first doctors in L.A., Dr. William B. Osborn (sometimes spelled as Osburn, Osbourne, or Osbourn), also credited as being the first "drug-store" establisher in Los Angeles, had turned his business over (to pursue other non-medical endeavors) to Dr. James P. McFarland and John Gately Downey. The store then under the control of the partnership between McFarland and Downey was then actually run by a Dr. Alexander Hope also a "druggist" as more of an employee of the two men. Downey had previously only apprenticed at an apothecary in Washington, D.C., until 1846 and later worked as an independent "druggist" in Cincinnati, Ohio, before finally arriving in California in 1849. Once in Los Angeles, Downey's main focus and foremost career ambition was mainly that of a politician rather than that of a schooled, professional apothecary or pharmacist. In 1856 Dr. McFarland had also left the business partnership and California to return home to Tennessee. Downey eventually sold the "drug-store" to Dr. Henry M. Myles and C.M. Small (in order to further pursue his true vocation in politics and go on to become the seventh Governor of California from 1860 to 1862) and shortly thereafter Dr. Myles died and a German immigrant, pharmacist had taken the business over. It was not until c. 1860, which saw the first of two European, immigrant, career pharmacists / apothecaries (both of German descent) who arrived in the newly founded American frontier town of Los Angeles, California. The first was the pharmacist Theodore Wollweber (Main St. / Hall at 59) and in 1861 his only competitor at the time, the second pharmacist Adolph Junge, who also established his "drug store" in the same Temple Block (Temple Street) area on 99 Main-St. north of Commercial St. and was in operation for about 20 years thereafter until ca. 1880. The future medical pioneer Dr. Joseph Kurtz (German) arrived in L.A. in 1868 at the encouragement and recommendation of close associate Adolph Junge and would go on to be the first Los Angeles County Medical Examiner - Coroner from 1870 to 1873 and again from 1876 to 1877 in addition to being one of the founders of the Los Angeles County Medical Association in 1871 and the professor of surgery at USC School of Medicine (founded in 1885 and in 1999 renamed as Keck School of Medicine of USC) for 25 years, from 1885 to 1910. Also, the later locally well-known (German) pharmacist F.J. Gieze came to work as a clerk and colleague following in 1874 for a time thereafter with Junge, and would later gain recognition as a trusted pharmacist. Around this same time period a Dr. J.M. Jansco (who specialized in "Diseases of Children") pediatrician had his practice located at Junge's drug-store as well as Dr. Osborn who had also maintained his office at Junge's drug-store from 1865 until his death in 1867. The original prescription book of pharmacist Adolph Junge bears historical witness to his activity and can still be viewed / researched today in the Natural History Museum of Los Angeles County (as part of the "Prudhomme Papers" Archives). The USC College of Pharmacy was established in 1905. Since the arrival of the first two European-schooled pharmacists in 1860, Wollweber and Junge, it would then take some 60+ years longer for the retail pharmacy industry as a whole to further develop, "when in 1919 brothers Harry and Robert Borun, along with brother-in-law Norman Levin, founded Borun Brothers, a Los Angeles drug wholesaler". Following 10 years later, in 1929, the brothers opened their own Los Angeles retail outlets under the name Thrifty Cut Rate, which would shortly thereafter be renamed to Thrifty Drug Store and in turn would usher in the age of the modern "drug, sundries & household wares" chain-store model with hired/contracted professional in-house pharmacists. The first store was located at 412 S. Broadway in downtown Los Angeles, just across the street from the original Broadway Department Store. By 1942, they operated 58 chain stores in and around the greater Los Angeles area, which also served as a business model that most all other large corporate drug store chains would follow.

=== Pharmacy and the Industrial Revolution ===
With the rise of mechanization and mass production, new modes of medication-delivery, among them the tablet (1884), the enteric-coated pill (1884) and the gelatin capsule (first produced on a large scale in 1875 by Parke, Davis & Company, Detroit) became practicable. By 1900, most pharmacies stocked the shelves, partially or predominantly, with medicines prefabricated en masse by the growing pharmaceutical industry instead of custom-produced by individual pharmacisti, and the traditional role of the scientifically trained pharmacist to produce medicines increasingly eroded. This shift worried many, raising concerns of quality control, professional irrelevance and more. William Procter lamented that, "If the pharmacist becomes a mere dispenser of medicines, 'he relapses into a simple shopkeeper.'”

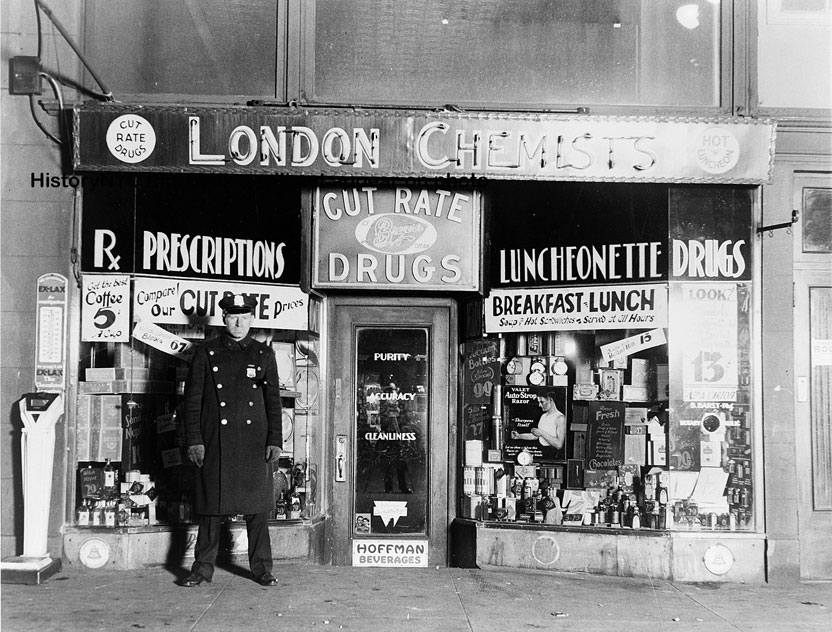
At the "London Chemists" drugstore at Eighth Avenue and 23rd Street in Manhattan, many foods and medicines are advertised, including Ex-lax. Photo taken following the gangland killing of Mad Dog Coll, who was using the drugstore phone booth, February 8th, 1932.

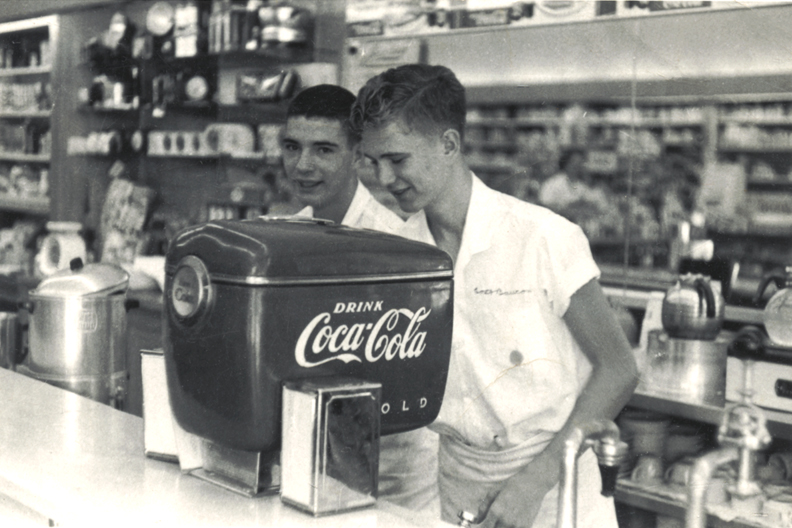
"Soda jerks" dispensing Coca-Cola at Fleeman's Pharmacy, Atlanta, Georgia, circa 1948. This photo documents the first-ever installation of this model of "Boat Motor"-styled Coca-Cola dispenser.

== 21st century developments ==
=== Background ===
By the turn of the 21st century, several factors gave rise to concerns about a shortage of primary care in the United States . From an aging generation of baby boomers to increasing numbers of physician retirees, it was projected that the United States would be short about 40,000-52,000 physicians by the 2020s. Furthermore, "implementation of the Affordable Care Act identifies millions of newly insured patients needing primary care." This shortage was viewed by many as an opportunity to expand the scope of practice of existing healthcare professionals, such as pharmacists.

=== Provider status ===
On the federal level, legislation regarding pharmacists' provider status was first introduced to the U.S. House of Representatives in 2014 by Representative Brett Guthrie (R-KY) in the 113th Congress. The purpose of the Pharmacy and Medically Underserved Areas Enhancement Act (HR 592) was to amend the Social Security Act to recognize pharmacists as healthcare providers and cover their services in medically underserved communities under Medicare Part B. This bill failed to pass and was reintroduced in 2015 by Representatives Brett Guthrie (R-KY), G.K. Butterfield (D-NC), and Todd Young (R-IN). Unfortunately, this bill expired once more at the end of the 114th Congress. It was reintroduced for the third time on Jan 12, 2017 during the 115th Congress by Representatives Sherrod Brown (D-OH), Bob Casey (D-PA), and Chuck Grassley (R-IA). The bill was referred to the Committee on Finance but was not enacted.

A number of states are expanding the pharmacist's scope of practice through the implementation of advanced practice pharmacy. In addition to the advanced practice designation, pharmacists in certain practice settings have been granted the ability to perform certain tasks under a collaborative practice agreement (CPA) with a physician. These tasks include the following:

- Assess the patient by gathering subjective and objective information
- Prescribe medications to manage disease states (starting, stopping, or adjusting treatment)
- Order lab tests and interpret the results
- Coordinate patient care with other healthcare professionals
- Develop relationships with patient to allow for ongoing care

Under this movement for expansion of pharmacists' scope of practice, the state of California instated Senate Bill 493 in 2014, written by Senator Ed Hernandez, authorizing pharmacists to furnish self-administered hormonal contraceptives, nicotine replacement products, and prescription medications recommended for international travelers not requiring a diagnosis, among other functions. The bill also authorized California-licensed pharmacists to order tests pertaining to the efficacy and safety of patient drug therapies as well as performing patient assessments. This bill was followed by Assembly Bill 1535 in 2014, granting California pharmacists the authority to furnish naloxone. As an adjunct to SB493 and AB1535, Assembly Bill 1114 was approved in California in 2016 to establish a fee schedule for pharmacist services under the Medi-Cal program, allowing for proper reimbursement of the following provided or furnished services:

- Furnishing naloxone hydrochloride for opioid overdose
- Initiating and administering immunizations
- Furnishing self-administered hormonal contraception
- Providing tobacco cessation counseling and furnishing nicotine replacement therapy
- Furnishing travel medications to individuals not requiring a diagnosis

In 2019, the California Department of Health Care Services (DHCS) established the fee schedule for AB1114, issuing the billing codes needed to implement the pharmacy services outlined by the bill. Under AB 1114, pharmacists may bill for services using CPT code 99201 for new patients, CPT code 99212 for established patients, or CPT code 90471 for immunization administration.

== Women in pharmacy in the United States ==
Elizabeth Gooking Greenleaf was the first female apothecary in the Thirteen Colonies. She is considered to be the first female pharmacist in the United States.

Mary Corinna Putnam Jacobi graduated from the New York College of Pharmacy in 1863, which made her the first woman to graduate from a United States school of pharmacy.

Susan Hayhurst was the first woman to receive a pharmacy degree in the United States, which occurred in 1883.

Cora Dow (1868–1915), a pharmacist in Cincinnati, Ohio, was the leading female pharmacist of her time, with eleven stores under her name when she died.

Julia Pearl Hughes (1873–1950) was the first African-American female pharmacist to own and operate her own drug store.

Anna Louise James (1886–1977) was the first African-American female pharmacist in Connecticut.

== See also ==
- History of pharmacy
- Pharmacy
- History of medicine
