= David Pam =

British librarian

David Pam

David O. Pam (February 1920 - 17 August 2014) was a British librarian and local historian known for his works on the history of Edmonton and Enfield and other areas of the former Edmonton Hundred.

== Early life ==
David Pam was born in Edmonton in February 1920. He spent his early life in a council house there.

== Family ==
Pam married Maisie in 1949. They had two daughters.

== Career ==
Pam was first a reference librarian for the former Borough of Edmonton and in 1976 the local history and museums officer for the London Borough of Enfield. He retired in May 1982 and afterwards devoted himself to writing the history of Edmonton and Enfield and other areas of the former Edmonton Hundred. He was president of the Edmonton Hundred Historical Society and appointed a fellow of the Royal Historical Society in 2006.

== Death ==
Pam died on 17 August 2014.

== Selected publications ==
- The Rude Multitude: Enfield and the Civil War. Edmonton Hundred Historical Society, 1977.
- The New Enfield: Stories of Enfield, Edmonton, and Southgate. London Borough of Enfield, 1977.
- The Hungry Years. Survival in Edmonton and Enfield before 1400. Edmonton Hundred Historical Society, 1980 ISBN 0902922386
- The Story of Enfield Chase. Enfield Preservation Society, Enfield, 1984. ISBN 0907318037
- A History of Enfield Volume One - Before 1837: A Parish Near London. Enfield Preservation Society, Enfield, 1990. ISBN 0907318096
- A History of Enfield Volume Two - 1837 to 1914: A Victorian Suburb. Enfield Preservation Society, Enfield, 1992. ISBN 090731810X
- A History of Enfield Volume Three - 1914 to 1939: A Desirable Neighbourhood. Enfield Preservation Society, Enfield, 1994. ISBN 0907318126
- The Royal Small Arms Factory Enfield & Its Workers. 1998. ISBN 0953227103
- A Woodland Hamlet - Winchmore Hill. Edmonton Hundred Historical Society, 2004 ISBN 0902922629
- Edmonton Ancient Village to Working Class Suburb. Edmonton Hundred Historical Society, 2006 ISBN 0902922645
- Enfield Town - Village Green to Shopping Precinct. Edmonton Hundred Historical Society, 2008 ISBN 9780902922662
