= The Enfield Society =

The Enfield Society

The Enfield Society, known as The Enfield Preservation Society until 2007, campaigns for "the conservation and enhancement of the civic and natural environments of the London Borough of Enfield and its immediate surrounding area".

== History ==
The society was founded in 1936 as a direct result of a campaign organised by Ebenezer Rees, vicar of Christ Church, Chase Side, to prevent Enfield District Council building new offices on green fields at Chase Green, Chase Side. A public meeting was held at the Oddfellows Hall in Old Park Road, Enfield, which was attended by Sir Henry Bowles Bart., Lt. Col. R.V.K. Applin DSO member of Parliament for Enfield, G.W. Daisley vicar of Enfield, the reverend Rees and Mr Dudley Leggatt. The opposition to the idea caused the council to withdraw their plans.

In 1938 the society campaigned against the development of the Library Green, in Church Street, and more recently it campaigned to restore the derelict Broomfield House in Broomfield Park, Palmers Green, and helped the restoration of the New River in Enfield town.

In 2007, the society changed its name from The Enfield Preservation Society to The Enfield Society.

== Organisation ==
The society is a registered charity No. 276451.

== Selected publications ==
- Pam, David. (1990) A History of Enfield Volume One - Before 1837: A Parish Near London. ISBN 0907318096
- Pam, David. (1992) A History of Enfield Volume Two - 1837 to 1914: A Victorian Suburb. ISBN 090731810X
- Pam, David. (1994) A History of Enfield Volume Three - 1914 to 1939: A Desirable Neighbourhood. ISBN 0907318126
- Williams, R. (1997) A portrait of Gentleman's Row. ISBN 0907318045
- Carter, Valerie. (2000) Treasures of Enfield: Discovering the Buildings of a London Borough. ISBN 0907318169.
- Smith, Monica. (2015) A History of Enfield Volume Four – 1939 to 1969: A Time of Change. ISBN 978-0907318231
