= International Society for the History of Pharmacy =

Non profit international society devoted to the academic study of the history of pharmacy

The International Society for the History of Pharmacy (ISHP) is a non profit international society devoted to the academic study of the history of pharmacy. The umbrella organization of 29 national societies promotes research, teaching and publication in pharmaceutical history. It regularly organizes congresses and awards a research grant every two years. Publication organs are an annual newsletter and the peer-reviewed journal Pharmaceutical Historian, which is published in cooperation with the British Society for the History of Pharmacy.

== History ==
On August 18, 1926, Otto Raubenheimer from the US, the Austrian Ludwig Winkler and the Germans Fritz Ferchl, Georg Urdang, Walther Zimmermann, founded the Gesellschaft für Geschichte der Pharmazie (Society for the History of Pharmacy) in Innsbruck, Austria The Second World War interrupted the society's activities but after that it reformed and in 1949 gave itself the name Internationale Gesellschaft für Geschichte der Pharmazie and also appears under equivalent English- or French-language names: International Society for the History of Pharmacy or Société Internationale d'Histoire de la Pharmacie.

== International congresses ==
The society holds a biennial International Congress. These congresses are an open platform for research presentations and also discussions about history of pharmacy in an truly international context.
