= J. G. L. Burnby =

Juanita "Nita" Gordon Lloyd Burnby (1923 - 3 July 2010) of Wirksworth, Derby, was a British pharmacist who was president of the British Society for the History of Pharmacy and the author of works on the history of the area once occupied by the Edmonton Hundred, and the history of medicine and pharmacy.

== Early life and family ==
Burnby was born Juanita Gordon Lloyd Thomas, in 1923. Her mother's maiden name was Gordon. Her birth was registered in the Darlington district. She was the fourth generation of her family to work in pharmacy. She married Matthew W. Burnby in Loughborough in 1959.

== Career ==
Burnby worked as a quality control analyst for John Richardson of Leicester and obtained a University of London external degree of Bachelor of Pharmacy from Leicester College of Technology. She registered as a pharmacist in 1946 and worked mainly in hospital pharmacy. She retired in 2005.

== History of pharmacy ==
Burnby developed an interest in history, architecture and archaeology as a student, which she developed while travelling between youth hostels. She joined the British Society for the History of Pharmacy early and eventually became its president. She wrote widely on the subject and edited the society's journal the Pharmaceutical Historian. She was a member of the International Academy for the History of Pharmacy. She wrote a thesis on the history of the English apothecary, for which she received the degree of Doctor of Philosophy, which was published as A Study of the English Apothecary from 1660 to 1760 by the Wellcome Trust Centre for the History of Medicine at University College London in 1983.

== Death ==
Burnby died on 3 July 2010, aged 86.

== Selected publications ==
- Plague, Pills and Surgery: The Story of the Bromfields. Edmonton Hundred Historical Society, 1975. (With T.D. Whittet) ISBN 0902922246
- And they Blew Exceeding Fine. Edmonton Hundred Historical Society, 1976. (With A.E. Robinson) ISBN 0902922254
- A Study of the English Apothecary from 1660 to 1760. Wellcome Trust Centre for the History of Medicine at UCL, 1983. ISBN 0854840435
- Now Turned Into Fair Garden Plots. Edmonton Hundred Historical Society, 1983. (With A.E. Robinson) ISBN 0902922416
- Drovers and Tanners of Enfield and Edmonton. Edmonton Hundred Historical Society, 1988. ISBN 0902922483
- Guns and Gunpowder in Enfield. Edmonton Hundred Historical Society, 1988. (With A.E. Robinson) ISBN 0902922475
- Caricatures and Comments. Merrell Dow Pharmaceuticals, 1989.
- Elizabethan Times in Tottenham, Edmonton and Enfield. Edmonton Hundred Historical Society, 1995. ISBN 0902922572
