= British Society for the History of Pharmacy =

Learned society

The British Society for the History of Pharmacy (BSHP) is an organisation in the United Kingdom devoted to the history of pharmacy. It was established in 1967, although its roots date to 1952, when the Council of the Pharmaceutical Society established a history of pharmacy committee. The society organises an annual conference and has published a journal, Pharmaceutical Historian, from its inception. Since 2017, it has been issued by BSHP on behalf of the International Society for the History of Pharmacy. From its foundation, BSHP has been keen to encourage the study of pharmacy history amongst students. This advocacy role has included providing lecturers for history courses at Schools of Pharmacy. Since the COVID-19 pandemic, these have been held online.

The organisation is affiliated with the International Society for the History of Pharmacy and the British Society for the History of Medicine. Its current president is Mark Nesbitt (2024–2027). Notable past presidents include Juanita Burnby.
