= Edward Kremers =

American pharmacist

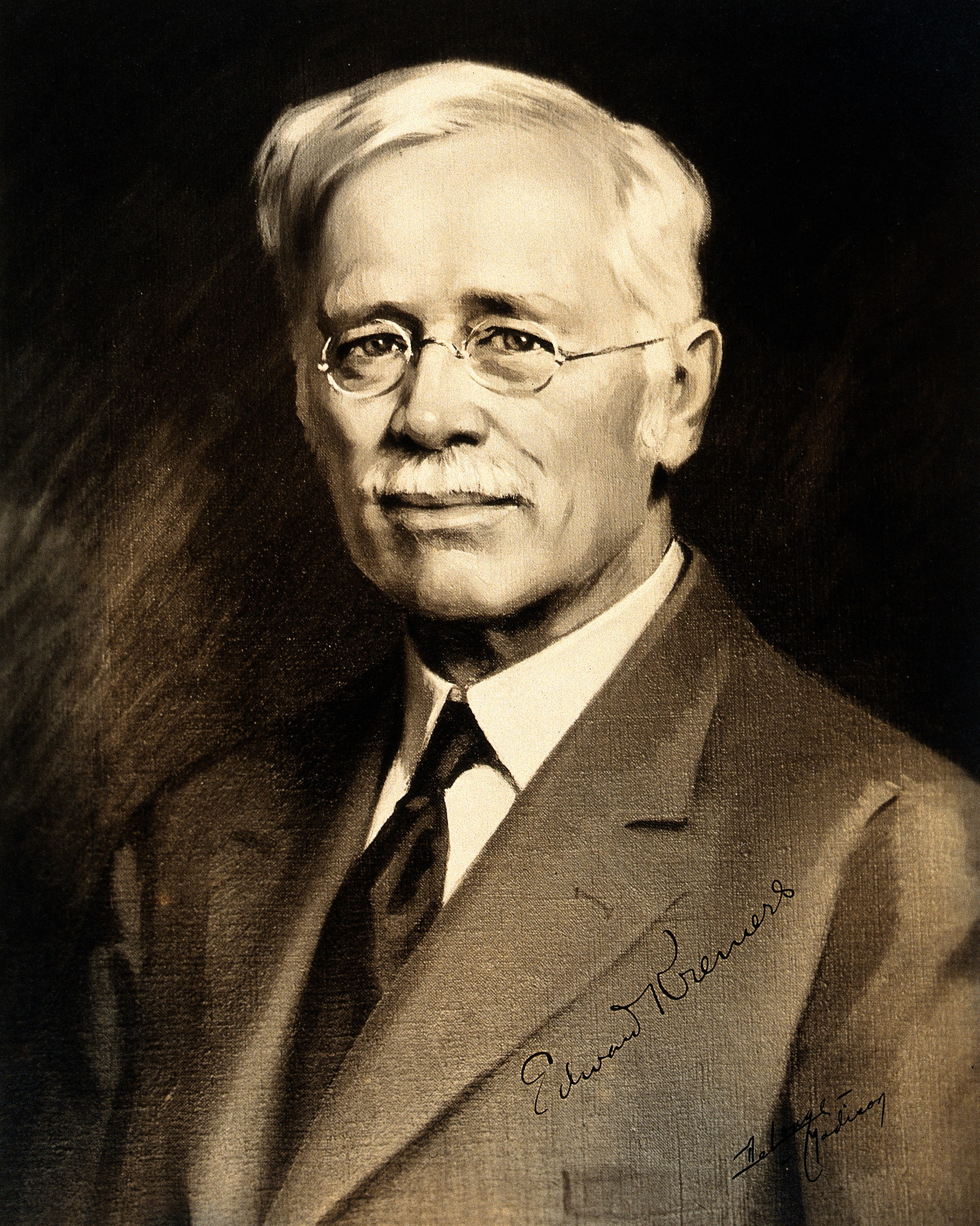
- Born: 23 February 1865; Milwakee, Wisconsin
- Died: 7 September 1941 (aged 76)
- Occupations: Pharmacist, Professor
- Known for: Pharmacy

Edward Kremers (February 23, 1865 – July 9, 1941) was an American pharmacologist and educator.

== Education ==
Edward Kremers began preparatory education before 1880 and the age of 15 at Missionshaus in Sheboygan, Wisconsin. After graduating, he returned to Milwakee and apprenticed as an Apotheke under Louis Lotz. In June 1885, he was granted a license by the Wisconsin Board of Pharmacy.

He graduated in Pharmacy from the University of Wisconsin in 1886 and received his Bachelor of Science from the same university in 1888, where he was a student of Frederick Belding Power. Between 1888 and 1890 he spent time in Germany, where he received his doctorate from the University of Göttingen with a thesis on isomerism in terpenes. Upon returning to the United States, he became a professor at the University of Wisconsin, a position he would combine with intense research activity, editing scientific journals, and participation in professional organizations (such as the American Pharmaceutical Association) throughout his career.

He is considered a reformer of pharmacology education. In 1892, he introduced major changes in the way the subject was taught, including the transition to a four-year degree. Initially, his ideas met with strong opposition from the American Pharmaceutical Association and the Wisconsin Pharmaceutical Association, among others. However, despite his youth, in the following years he overcame this resistance and his proposals ended up being adopted.

Among other recognitions, he was awarded the Ebert Prize twice (1887 and 1900).

== Edward Kremers Award ==
The Edward Kremers Award, established a year earlier by the American Institute of the History of Pharmacy, has been awarded since 1962. It is awarded to the author(s) of a book or series of articles on the history of pharmacy and drugs that stands out for its quality and academic rigor.

== Personal life ==
Edward was born on February 23, 1865 to Geherd Kremers (1826–1906) and Elise Petronella Kamper (1836–1913). He grew up in a neighborhood of Milwaukee with very strong German ethnic identity. He later recalled "there were in my class two or at the most three children who did not participate in the instructions in German,".

He married Laura Haase in 1892, with whom he would have two sons and two daughters. He died on July 9, 1941.
