= William Lewis (chemist, died 1781) =

British chemist & physician (c.1708–1781)

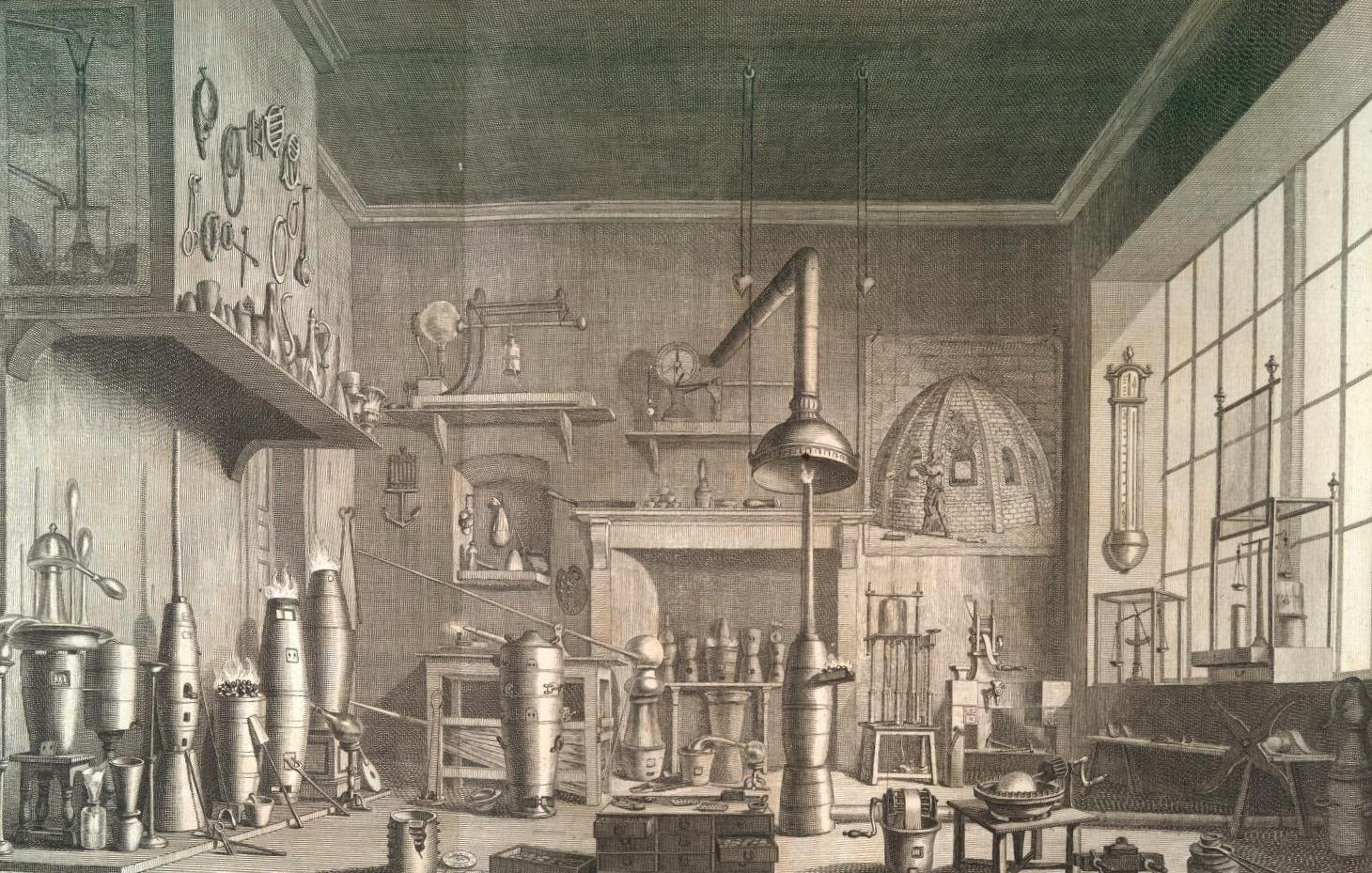
An eighteenth-century chemical laboratory, from Commercium Philosophico-Technicum by William Lewis

William Lewis FRS (c. 1708 – 21 January 1781) was a British chemist and physician. He is known for his writings related to pharmacy and medicine, and for his research into metals.

== Life and work ==
William Lewis, the son of John (William?) Lewis, a brewer, was born in Richmond, Surrey. He matriculated at Christ Church, Oxford, on 17 March 1730. He graduated B.A. in 1734, and proceeded M.A. 1737, M.B. 1741, and M.D. 1745. He practiced as a physician, and in 1746 was living in Dover Street, London, but shortly afterwards moved to Kingston upon Thames. At the opening of the Radcliffe Library in 1749, Lewis delivered the oration.

== Honours ==
- Fellow of the Royal Society (1745)
- Copley Medal (1754) "For the Many Experiments made by him on Platina, which tend to the discovery of the sophistication of gold:—which he would have entirely completed, but was obliged to put a stop to his further enquiries for want of materials."

== Selected writings ==
- A Course of Practical Chemistry, London, 1746, 8vo.
- Pharmacopœia Edinburgensis, London, 1748, 8vo.
- The New Dispensatory, London, 1753, Digital edition 8vo, Edinburgh, 1781 Digital edition by the University and State Library Düsseldorf, 1791.
- Experimental History of the Materia Medica, London, 1761 Digital edition by the University and State Library Düsseldorf; 3rd edit, by J. Aiken, 1784; German translation, 1771.
- Willhelm Lewis Materia medica oder Beschreibung der einfachen Arzneymittel . Orell, Geßner, Füeßlin & Co., Zürich 1771 Digital edition by the University and State Library Düsseldorf
- Commercium Philosophico-Technicum, London, 1763 Digital edition, 4to.
- Neues verbessertes Dispensatorium oder Arzneybuch, in welchem alles, was zu der Apothekerkunst gehöret, nach den Londoner und Edinburger Pharmacopeen mit practischen Wahrnehmungen und Bemerkungen vorgetragen wird; aus dem Engländischen übersetzet. Brandt, Hamburg 2 Bände 1768/1772 Digital edition by the University and State Library Düsseldorf
- The new dispensatory : contains 1. The elements of pharmacy, 2. The materia medica, or an account of the substances employed in medicine, 3. The preparations and compositions of the new London and Edinburgh pharmacopoeias; the whole interspersed with practical cautions and observations. F. Wingrave, London 6th ed. 1799 Digital edition by the University and State Library Düsseldorf

Lewis also published translations of Caspar Neumann's chemical works in 1759 Digital edition and 1773 (Vol. I & Vol. II), and (posthumously) of Hoffman's System of the Practice of Medicine (1783). In 1754 and 1757 he published a series of original papers on platinum: Phil. Trans. R. Soc. 48 (1754) 638–689 (Papers I–IV), Phil. Trans. R. Soc. 50 (1757) 148–155 (Paper V) & Phil. Trans. R. Soc. 50 (1757) 156–166 (Paper VI). In 1767 the Society for the Improvement of Arts, Manufactures, &c., of which he was a founder, awarded him a gold medal for an essay upon 'potashes'.

== Death ==
He died in Kingston, Surrey on 21 January 1781 and was buried in Richmond.
