= Edmonton Hundred =

Historical division of Middlesex, England

Coordinates: 51.645°N 0.060°W

Edmonton
- Area
  - 1831: 31,410 acres (127.1 km^{2})
- Population
  - 1831: 26,930
  - 1881: 94,185
- History
  - Created: in antiquity
  - Abolished: no administrative or legal role after 1886, but never formally abolished.
  - Succeeded by: Edmonton Urban District; Enfield Urban District; East Barnet Urban District; South Mimms Rural District; Tottenham Urban District
- Status: hundred
  - HQ: see text

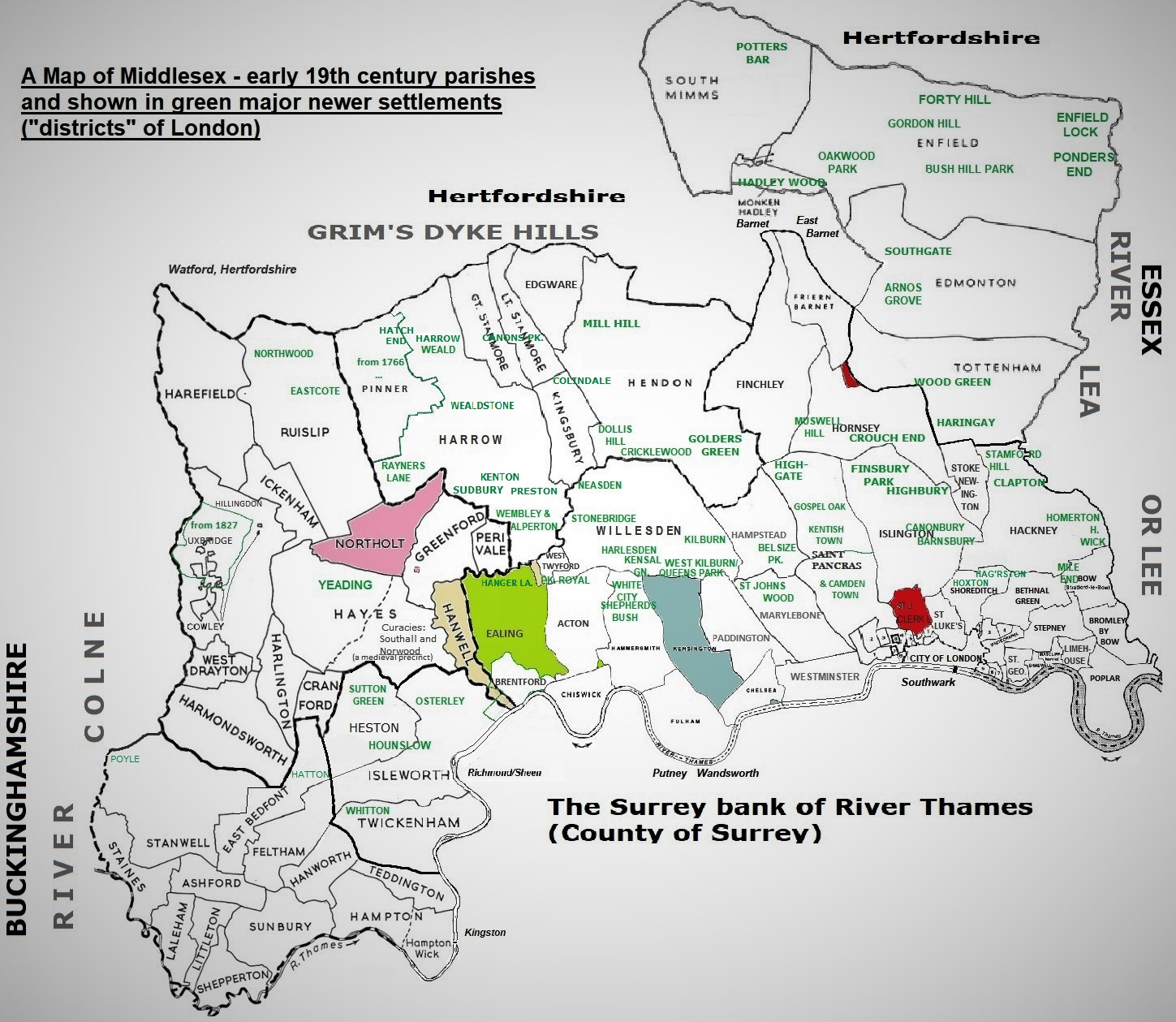
The parishes and major newer settlements in the Hundred which extended from Tottenham (inclusive) northwards then westwards.

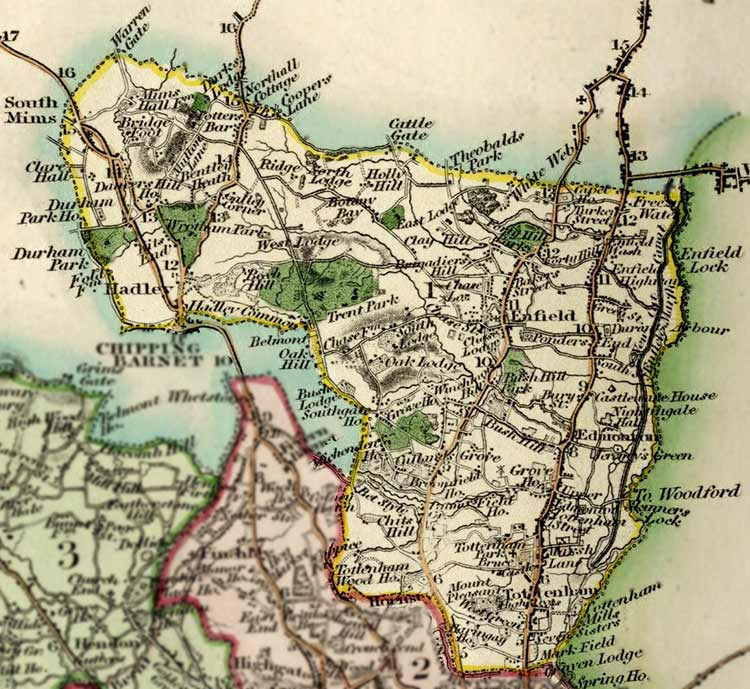
1820 map of the Edmonton Hundred by Greenwood based on the boundaries stated in Domesday Book of 1086.

Edmonton is one of six hundreds (obsolete subdivisions) of the historic county of Middlesex, England. A rotated L-shape, its area has been in the south and east firmly part of the urban growth of London. Since the 1965 formation of London boroughs (see Greater London) it mainly corresponds to the London Boroughs of Enfield, a negligible portion of Barnet and a narrow majority of Haringey. Its ancient parish of South Mimms (including the later civil parish of Potters Bar) has since 1965 been part of the Hertsmere district in Hertfordshire.

== History ==
The hundred's name means 'farm/settlement of Eadhelm'.

The hundred was listed in Domesday Book in 1086, after which there were only very minor boundary changes. It was sometimes known as the Half Hundred of Mimms.

It contained the parishes and settlements of Edmonton, Enfield, Monken Hadley, South Mimms and Tottenham. It bordered Ossulstone hundred to the south west, and had a boundary with Essex to the east. To the north then west it projected into Hertfordshire (containing South Mimms and Monken Hadley) which county had long borders with all of the parishes except for Tottenham. The eastern successors to the three easterly ecclesiastical parishes continue to adjoin Essex across the (River Lea) but due to urbanisation the three simple parishes have more Church of England parishes today.

The Hundred Moot appears to have originally been held near Potters Bar. By the seventeenth century the "mote plane" was in an open area of Enfield Chase. The court for the hundred eventually moved to a public house in Enfield prior to its abolition in 1846.

In 1889, under the Local Government Act 1888, the area forming the small civil parish of Monken Hadley was transferred to Hertfordshire reflecting the growth of Barnet as a town.

== Area and population change ==
The following is the population of the parishes in Edmonton Hundred as given at each ten-yearly census from 1801 - 1881:

| Parish | Area | 1801 | 1811 | 1821 | 1831 | 1841 | 1851 | 1861 | 1871 | 1881 |
|---|---|---|---|---|---|---|---|---|---|---|
| Edmonton | 7,483 acres (30.3 km^{2}) | 5,093 | 6,824 | 7,900 | 8,192 | 9,027 | 9,708 | 10,930 | 13,860 | 23,463 |
| Enfield | 12,653 acres (51.2 km^{2}) | 5,881 | 6,636 | 8,227 | 8,812 | 9,367 | 9,453 | 12,424 | 16,054 | 19,104 |
| Monken Hadley | 641 acres (2.6 km^{2}) | 584 | 718 | 926 | 979 | 945 | 1,003 | 1,053 | 978 | 1,160 |
| South Mimms | 6,386 acres (25.8 km^{2}) | 1,698 | 1,628 | 1,906 | 2,010 | 2,760 | 2,825 | 3,238 | 3,571 | 4,002 |
| Tottenham | 4,642 acres (18.8 km^{2}) | 3,629 | 4,771 | 5,812 | 6,937 | 8,584 | 9,120 | 13,240 | 22,869 | 46,456 |
| Total | 31,805 acres (128.7 km^{2}) | 16,885 | 20,577 | 24,771 | 26,930 | 30,683 | 32,109 | 40,885 | 57,332 | 94,185 |

== Replacement ==
The hundreds of England declined in administrative use because of the rise of various ad-hoc boards and the gradual takeover of all types of jurisdiction by the King's courts, the courts of England and Wales. In the sixteenth century many of the powers of the manorial lords who would convene at the Hundred Court was stripped by placing their taxation powers and responsibilities in the board of each parish, the vestry. By 1894 whatever residual significance they had was replaced by a system of uniform local government districts, which were consolidated over time. Hundreds had been used in the Redistribution of Seats Act 1885 to define many constituencies but not by the Reform Act 1867 which preferred the Poor Law Unions. As to Edmonton Hundred its constituent parts split in 1965 four ways: three parts contributed to London boroughs and one part already constituting Potters Bar Urban District moved to Hertfordshire as its senior local government body which in 1974 united into a wider non-metropolitan district ranking beneath Hertfordshire County Council named Hertsmere.

| Ancient Parish | District | Today | Extent of contribution |
|---|---|---|---|
| Edmonton (included Southgate as a chapelry) | Edmonton Urban District; Southgate Urban District | London Borough of Enfield | all |
| Enfield | Enfield Urban District | London Borough of Enfield | all |
| Monken Hadley | East Barnet Urban District | London Borough of Barnet | minor contrib. |
| South Mimms (included Potters Bar as a chapelry) | South Mimms Rural District | Hertsmere District in Hertfordshire | minor contrib. |
| Tottenham | Tottenham Urban District; Wood Green Urban District | London Borough of Haringey | major contrib. |

== See also ==
- Edmonton Hundred Historical Society
