= Christopher Greenwood (cartographer) =

English cartographers

Christopher (1786–1855) and John Greenwood (1791–1840) were brother cartographers who produced large-scale maps of England and Wales in the 1820s.

In 1818 they formed a partnership in London with sollicitor George Pringle and surveyor George Kemp. The business was highly productive at first, printing many county surveys, but later fell into financial trouble and closed in 1828.

Christopher was imprisoned for debt in 1834 and the brothers' printing plates were sold to pay their debts.

== Publications ==
- 1818: Christopher Greenwood's Map of Yorkshire
- 1818: Henry Teesdale’s Map of Yorkshire
- 1828: Map of the county of York, made on the basis of triangles in the county, determined by Lieutenant Coll. Wm Mudge, Royal Artillery, F.R.S. and Captain Thomas Colby, Royal Engineers, in the Trigonometrical Survey of England, by order of the Honourable Board of Ordnance, and surveyed in the years 1815, 1816, & 1817, by C. Greenwood, Wakefield. Leeds, Robinson, Son & Holdsworth, Wakefield, John Hurst & C. Greenwood, 4 June 1817.
- 1817–30: Large-scale maps of all the counties except Buckinghamshire, Cambridgeshire, Herefordshire, Hertfordshire, Norfolk, Oxfordshire and Rutland
- 1827: Greenwood's Map of London 1827 – from surveys in 1824, 1825 and 1826
- 1834: Atlas of the Counties of England
