= Regenerative medicine advanced therapy =

Drug candidate designation in the United States

Regenerative Medicine Advanced Therapy (RMAT) is a designation given by the Food and Drug Administration to drug candidates intended to treat serious or life-threatening conditions under the 21st Century Cures Act. A RMAT designation allows for accelerated approval based surrogate or intermediate endpoints.

RMAT goes beyond breakthrough therapy features by allowing for accelerated approval of drugs based on surrogate endpoints. A surrogate endpoint is a biomarker that substitutes for a direct endpoint, such as clinical benefit.

== Legal background ==
Section 3033 of the 21st Century Cures Act introduces section 506(g) of the Federal Food, Drug, and Cosmetic Act (FD&C Act) that allows for the designation of certain therapies as a 'regenerative medicine advanced therapy' (RMAT) (21 U.S.C. § 356).

=== Qualifying criteria ===
In order to qualify for RMAT status, a treatment must

1. meet the definition of a regenerative medicine therapy,
2. intend to treat, modify, reverse or cure a serious condition, and
3. be supported by preliminary clinical evidence that indicates the RMAT candidate can address the clinical need.

A regenerative medicine therapy is defined in section 506(g)(8) of the FD&C Act to include cell therapies, therapeutic tissue engineering, human cell and tissue products. Under the FDA's interpretation, gene therapies and genetically modified cells that have a lasting effect, such as CAR-T antitumor therapies, may also qualify as regenerative medicine therapies.

== Effect ==
A RMAT designation includes all benefits of the Fast Track and breakthrough therapy designations. In addition, it opens up early interactions between the FDA and sponsors to facilitate accelerated approval. In this context, accelerated approval means approval based on

1. previously agreed-upon surrogate or intermediate endpoints, or
2. data from a limited but meaningful number of sites.

The ability to use 'Real World Evidence' (RWE), i.e. post-market evidence of safety and effectiveness, is particularly useful in the context of orphan diseases, where recruiting a sufficiently large cohort for pre-marketing clinical trials may not be feasible. RWE may include data from patient registries, clinical records and case studies.

Where a RMAT's sponsor fails to comply with the requirements for accelerated approval, the RMAT designation and the benefits conferred by it can be withdrawn (21 CFR 601.43).

== Examples ==
List of pharmaceuticals designated as RMATs
Name	Designee	Type	Biological target	Therapeutic indication
RPESC-RPE-4W	Luxa Biotechnology	autologous stem cell	retinal pigment epithelium	Dry age-related macular degeneration and geographic atrophy
ED-101	Abeona Therapeutics	cell therapy	Collagen, type VII, alpha 1	Recessive dystrophic epidermolysis bullosa
ABO-102	Abeona Therapeutics	gene therapy	SGSH	Mucopolysaccharidosis Type III (Sanfilippo syndrome)
ADP-A2M4	Adaptimmune Therapeutics	SPEAR T-cells	MAGEA4	Synovial sarcoma
ALLO-715	Allogene Therapeutics	allogeneic CAR-T	B-cell maturation antigen	Refractory/relapsed multiple myeloma
ALVR-105 Viralym-M	Allovir	allogeneic CAR-T	BK virus, CMV, adenoviridae, Epstein–Barr virus, human herpesvirus 6, JC virus (human polyomavirus 2)	BK virus associated hemorrhagic cystitis after hematopoietic stem cell transplantation
AB205	Angiocrine Bioscience	allogeneic cord endothelial cells		Severe regimen-related toxicities from conditioning chemotherapy prior to hematopoietic stem cell transplantation in patients with lymphomas
AST-OPC1	Asterias Biotherapeutics	allogeneic oligodendrocyte progenitor cells		Spinal cord injuries
AT132	Audentes Therapeutics	gene therapy	Myotubularin 1	X-linked myotubular myopathy
Valoctocogene roxaparvovec (Roctavian, Valrox)	BioMarin Pharmaceutical	gene therapy	F8	Haemophilia A
Betibeglogene autotemcel (Lentiglobin)	bluebird bio	gene therapy	Hemoglobin subunit beta	Sickle cell disease
Lisocabtagene maraleucel (Breyanzi)	Bristol Myers Squibb	autologous CAR-T	CD19	Diffuse large B-cell lymphoma
CLBS14 (Ologo)	Caladrius Biosciences	autologous cell therapy	CD34	Refractory angina
CAP-1002	Capricor Therapeutics	allogeneic cell therapy		Duchenne muscular dystrophy
CT053	CARsgen Therapeutics	autologous CAR-T	B-cell maturation antigen	Refractory or relapsed multiple myeloma
Descartes-08	Cartesian Therapeutics, Inc.	autologous RNA CAR-T	B-cell maturation antigen	Generalized myasthenia gravis
Romyelocel-L	Cellerant Therapeutics	allogeneic cell therapy		Serious bacterial and fungal infections during induction chemotherapy in acute myeloid leukemia
CTX001	CRISPR Therapeutics Vertex Pharmaceuticals	gene therapy	Fetal hemoglobin	Sickle cell disease Transfusion-dependent beta thalassemia
RVT-802	Enzyvant	allogeneic cell therapy	Thymus tissue	Congenital athymia in DiGeorge syndrome
ECT-001	ExCellThera	allogeneic cell therapy		Hematologic malignancies
FCX-007 (dabocemagene autoficel)	Fibrocell Castle Creek Biosciences	gene therapy	Collagen, type VII, alpha 1	Recessive dystrophic epidermolysis bullosa
Ilixadencel	Immunicum AB	allogeneic cell therapy		Renal cell carcinoma
Lifileucel	Iovance Biotherapeutics	autologous cell therapy		Metastatic melanoma that progresses after an anti-PD-1 treatment
MGTA-456	Magenta Therapeutics	allogeneic cell therapy	CD34	Promoting hematopoietic stem cell transplant engraftment in Hurler syndrome, metachromatic leukodystrophy and Krabbe disease
MDR-101	Medeor Therapeutics	allogeneic cell therapy	CD34, CD3	Prevention of kidney transplant rejection
MB-107	Mustang Bio St. Jude Children's Research Hospital	gene therapy	Common gamma chain	X-linked severe combined immunodeficiency
RP-L102	Rocket Pharmaceuticals Inc.	gene therapy	FANCA	Fanconi anemia
VY-AADC	Voyager Therapeutics	gene therapy	Aromatic L-amino acid decarboxylase	Parkinson's disease
RP-L201	Rocket Pharmaceuticals Inc.	gene therapy using autologous CD34+ enriched cells	Integrin beta 2	Leukocyte adhesion deficiency Type I
OTL-103	Orchard Therapeutics	gene therapy using autologous cells	WASp	Wiskott–Aldrich syndrome

== Statistics ==
In 2020, the FDA received 34 requests for RMAT status, of which 12 (35.3%) were granted. RMAT designated drugs include the novel CAR-T therapy Kymriah and betibeglogene autotemcel for beta thalassemia. As of 31 March 2021, 62 requests for RMAT status have been granted.

More than half of the RMAT applications received by March 2019 involved autologous or allogeneic cell therapy products, including CAR-T therapies.

== See also ==
- Breakthrough therapy
- Advanced Therapy Medicinal Product (European Medicines Agency equivalent)
- Sakigake (Japanese equivalent)
- Orphan drug
