= OTL-103 =

Gene therapy for Wiskott-Aldrich Syndrome

OTL-103 (GSK-2696275) is a gene therapy for Wiskott–Aldrich syndrome, a rare primary immunodeficiency caused by mutations in the gene that codes for Wiskott–Aldrich syndrome protein (WASp). It was developed by Orchard Therapeutics in conjunction with GlaxoSmithKline. It is currently undergoing Phase I/II of clinical trials that are expected to conclude in October 2025.

== Development history ==
OTL-103 is based on the lentiviral vector technology licensed from GlaxoSmithKline by Orchard Therapeutics in 2020. In 2019, the Food and Drug Administration granted OTL-103 Regenerative Medicine Advanced Therapy status. In the same year, the first clinical trial using OTL-103 for severe cases of Wiskott–Aldrich syndrome began at the San Raffaele Hospital in Milan, Italy. Orchard Therapeutics expected to file a Biologics License Application with the Food and Drug Administration in 2021, however, due to the COVID-19 pandemic's impact on drug development, this was postponed to 2022.

== Mechanism of action ==
OTL-103 is an autologous cell therapy that uses the patient's own CD34+ cells collected from bone marrow or peripheral blood. These are then transfected with a lentiviral vector that encodes for a functional Wiskott–Aldrich syndrome protein. The transfected cells are then reinfused to the patient. The cells migrate to the bone marrow, where they produce functional copies of Wiskott–Aldrich syndrome protein. This would mitigate the symptoms of Wiskott-Aldrich syndrome, such as frequent infections, autoimmune disorders and cancers.
