= RVT-802 =

Experimental allogeneic

RVT-802 (allogeneic cultured postnatal thymus-derived tissue) is a medication being developed by Enzyvant Therapeutics Ireland Limited for the treatment of congenital athymia (absence of a thymus gland), especially in the context of DiGeorge syndrome.

== Development history ==
Enzyvant licensed the technology underlying RVT-802 from Duke University in 2017. In the same year, the Food and Drug Administration granted Regenerative Medicine Advanced Therapy – the second such approval ever to be granted – status to RVT-802. In December 2019, the Food and Drug Administration raised concerns about the manufacturing of RVT-802, and declined to approve it, instead issuing a Complete Response Letter. In April 2021, Enzyvant resubmitted its Biologics License Application. It is expected that the review of RVT-802 will conclude in October 2021 (PDUFA date).

== Method of action ==
RVT-802 is an investigational treatment for congenital athymia, primarily associated with DiGeorge syndrome. It is a tissue-based therapy that consists of cultured donor thymus-derived tissue. RVT-802 consists of donor thymus-derived tissue that is cultured and surgically implanted into the recipient

In patients with congenital athymia, the thymus gland is absent. Because of the crucial role the thymus gland plays in the maturation and differentiation of T cells, athymia results in severe immunodeficiency, typically resulting in death within the first two years of life.

RVT-802 is manufactured by extracting thymus tissue from infants undergoing cardiac surgery, depleting it of immature T cells to prevent graft-versus-host disease, then implanting the processed tissue into the recipient's leg, where it fulfils the immunological role of the thymus.
