= Animal drug =

Pharmaceutical medications in veterinary science

An animal drug (also veterinary drug) refers to a drug intended for use in the diagnosis, cure, mitigation, treatment, or prevention of disease in non-human animals.

== Regulation ==
=== United States ===
The U.S. Food and Drug Administration (FDA) has the broad mandate under the Federal Food, Drug, and Cosmetic Act (21 U.S.C. 321 et seq.) to assure the safety and effectiveness of animal drugs and their use in all animals, including farm animals. The division of the FDA responsible for this is the Center for Veterinary Medicine (CVM). The equivalents of the Investigational New Drug and New Drug Application are known as the Investigational New Animal Drug and New Animal Drug Application, respectively. The FDA enumerates veterinary drug approvals in the FDA Green Book. Drugs approved by the FDA for use in veterinary medicine are structurally similar to drugs approved for use in humans, owing to highly conserved physiology across species, and half of drugs approved for animals are separately approved for use in humans.

Before CVM formally approves an animal drug, the sponsor or manufacturer of the drug must document in scientific testing that the drug has been found "safe and effective". The testing data also must demonstrate that a methodology is available to detect and measure any residue left in edible animal products. Farmers and veterinarians using drugs on farm animals must adhere to guidelines about how much time must elapse before a treated animal can be slaughtered, and any other use constraints or warnings stated on the drug label.

Animal biologics (e.g., vaccines and tests) are regulated by the Animal and Plant Health Inspection Service.

== See also ==
- Drug packaging
- List of veterinary drugs
- Veterinary medicine
- Veterinary pathology
