= Pierre Charneau =

French virologist

Pierre Charneau /ʃɑːrˈnoʊ/ is a French virologist, inventor, and head of the Molecular Virology and Vaccinology Unit (VMV) at the Pasteur Institute and an acknowledged specialist in HIV, lentiviral gene transfer vectors, and their medical applications. His discovery of the central DNA-flap structure in the HIV genome, and its role in viral entry into the nucleus of the infected cell, grounded the optimization of lentiviral vectors and allowed for more than 20 years of development in gene therapy and vaccines based on this gene delivery technology. Charneau has published more than 100 research articles and holds 25 patents in the field of HIV and lentiviral vectors.

== Education ==
Charneau studied at the Pierre and Marie Curie University (UPMC) in Paris from which he holds a research doctorate in Molecular and Cellular Biology (1995). After a short time in undergraduate research at the Curie Institute, he pursued his Ph.D. thesis in Luc Montagnier’s Viral Oncology Lab at the Pasteur Institute on reverse transcription, nuclear import, and mitosis-independent integration of HIV genome.

== Career and research ==
Charneau's research led to the discovery and characterization of the central DNA flap structure within the HIV genome and its key function in nuclear import of the lentivirus/HIV genome in non-dividing cells. This discovery enabled the development of lentiviral vectors that can infect non-dividing cells, contrary to other types of retroviral gene transfer vectors, which can only target dividing cells. Since 2000, Charneau has led his own research group at the Pasteur Institute focusing on molecular virology and vectorology. His research has specialized in lentiviral vectors medicinal applications and his publications and patents have led to extensive developments in gene therapy, as well as prophylactic and therapeutic vaccinations in infectious diseases and oncology.

Charneau's development of lentiviral vectors are used in many therapeutic approaches such as those carried out by bluebird bio, CAR-T, Novartis (CAR-T), Kite (TCR), Immune Design (Cancer vaccines) and TheraVectys.

== Awards and honors ==
- 2004 – Award of the French Academy of Science – Prix Jean-Pierre Lecocq
- 2009 – Line Renaud Award of the Fondation pour la Recherche Médicale

== See also ==
- Retinal gene therapy using lentiviral vectors
- Viral vector
- Lentiviral vector in gene therapy
- Chimeric antigen receptor
