= List of Sorbonne University people =

This is a list of alumni, former staff, and those otherwise associated with Sorbonne University (and the former autonomous universities Paris-IV Sorbonne and Paris-VI Pierre and Marie Curie). This list is incomplete.

== Notable alumni ==
=== Nobel laureates ===
- Claude Cohen-Tannoudji (Nobel Prize in Physics 1997)
- Emmanuelle Charpentier (Nobel Prize in Chemistry 2020)
- Françoise Barré-Sinoussi (Nobel Prize in Physiology or Medicine)
- Serge Haroche (Nobel Prize in Physics 2012)
- Gérard Mourou (Nobel Prize in Physics 2018)

=== Arts and humanities ===
- Donald Adamson (1939–2024), British historian
- Shmuel Agmon (1922–2025), Israeli mathematician
- Hamad Bin Abdulaziz Al-Kawari (born 1948), Qatari diplomat
- Sophia Antoniadis (1895–1972), classical scholar and first female professor at Leiden University
- Philippe Barbarin (born 1950), French Catholic Archbishop of Lyon and cardinal
- Charlotte Casiraghi (born 1986), Italian fashion journalist
- Karl P. Cohen (1913–2012), American physical chemist
- Ioan Petru Culianu (1950–1991), Romanian historian
- Abiol Lual Deng (born 1983), South Sudanese-American political scientist
- Mamadou Diouf, Senegalese professor of Western African history at Columbia University
- Julia Ducournau, French director and screenwriter
- Marie Drucker (born 1974), French journalist
- Soudabeh Fazaeli (born 1947), Iranian seismologist, researcher, mythologist and writer
- Luc Ferry (born 1951), French philosopher
- Henri Guaino (born 1957) French politician
- William Irigoyen (born 1970), French journalist
- Besiana Kadare (born 1972), Albanian Ambassador to the UN
- Samir Kassir (1960–2005), Lebanese-French professor of history at Saint-Joseph University
- Jiddu Krishnamurti (born 1895), Indian philosopher
- Thanh Hai Ngo (born 1947), Vietnamese-Canadian senator
- Caterina Magni (born 1966) Italian-French archaeologist
- Shahrzad Rafati (born 1980), Iranian-Canadian media entrepreneur
- Bernard Romain (born 1944), French painter and sculptor
- Christiane Taubira (born 1952), Minister of Justice of France
- Habib Tawa (born 1945), Lebanese-French historian
- Jean-Pierre Thiollet (born 1956), French writer
- Shunichi Yamaguchi (born 1950), Japanese politician
- Nureldin Satti, Sudanese diplomat and ambassador to the United States.
- Jemima West (born 1987), Anglo-French actress
- Baby Varghese Indian scholar and professor
- Zahia Ziouani (born 1978), French composer

=== Science, engineering and medicine ===
- Claude Bartolone, French politician, former President of the National Assembly
- Dominique Strauss-Kahn, French economist, politician and senior international civil servant
- Claude Cohen-Tannoudji, French physicist, Nobel laureate
- Nicole Capitaine, French astronomer
- Emmanuelle Charpentier, French microbiologist, biochemist and Nobel laureate
- Françoise Barré-Sinoussi, French virologist and Nobel laureate
- Serge Haroche, French physicist, Nobel laureate
- Gérard Mourou, French physicist, Nobel laureate
- Georges Calas, French mineralogist
- Vincent Calvez, French mathematician
- Sébastien Candel, French physicist
- Eudald Carbonell, Spanish archaeologist, anthropologist and paleontologist
- Sophie Carenco, French chemist
- Pierre Charneau, French virologist
- Cécile Charrier, French neuroscience researcher
- Daniel Choquet, French neuroscientist
- Gérard Denis Cohen, French computer science professor
- Dominique Costagliola, French epidemiologist
- Virginie Courtier-Orgogozo, French biologist
- Nicolas Courtois, French and British cryptographer
- Jean Dalibard, French physicist
- Olivier Danvy, French computer scientist
- Bernard Debré, French urologist and politician (1944–2020)
- Jean-Pierre Demailly, French mathematician (1957–2022)
- Julie Diani, French academic in the field of mechanics of polymeric materials
- Sindika Dokolo, Congolese art collector and businessman (1972–2020)
- Maïmouna Doucouré, French filmmaker (born 1985)
- Bérengère Dubrulle, French astrophysicist (born 1965)
- Catherine Dulac, French–American biologist
