= Complete Response Letter =

Regulatory action by the US Food and Drug Administration

In United States pharmaceutical regulatory practice, a Complete Response Letter (CRL), or more rarely, a 314.110 letter, is a regulatory action by the Food and Drug Administration (FDA) in response to a New Drug Application (NDA), Abbreviated NDA (ANDA), or Biologics License Application (BLA), indicating that the application will not be approved in its present form. CRLs replaced approvable letters in 2018.

== Background ==
Under the Prescription Drug User Fee Act (PDUFA), the FDA has a limited timespan (with a deadline known as the PDUFA date) to issue a decision on an NDA, ANDA, or BLA. The FDA may either approve the application or issue a Complete Response Letter (CRL). Grounds behind issuing a CRL may include labeling issues, current Good Manufacturing Practice (cGMP) concerns or concerns about the safety or effectiveness of the drug.

A sponsor receiving a CRL may withdraw the application, request a hearing, or resubmit the application. Because hearings are open to the public, this course of action is relatively rarely chosen.

== Class 1 and Class 2 resubmissions after CRLs ==
MAPP 6020 Rev. 2, the FDA policy section governing resubmissions following a CRL, classifies CRLs as requiring a Class 1 or Class 2 resubmission. Where a sponsor decides to submit a response to a CRL, the response is classified within 30 days, if the response is complete. A Class 1 response typically denotes minor amendments, such as labeling, assay validation data or minor re-analysis of the data supporting the application, while a Class 2 response typically involves more extensive concerns and/or a reinspection. A Class 1 response is typically handled within 3 months, while a Class 2 response is typically handled within 6 months.

== Economic impact ==
A CRL frequently has a significant impact on the sponsor's share price. Orphazyme, a Danish biopharmaceutical company, lost over half of its share value overnight upon disclosing a CRL for arimoclomol, a proposed treatment for Niemann–Pick disease, type C, forcing the company to restructure. BioMarin Pharmaceutical lost over 30% of its value when a CRL was issued in respect of its hemophilia A gene therapy, valoctocogene roxaparvovec. Sesen Bio's stock price dropped over 80% after reporting a CRL for Vicineum as a treatment for a type of bladder cancer.

== Disclosure ==
Typically, CRLs are not disclosed publicly as they often include proprietary information. Press releases, when issued, typically do not include most of the details contained in the CRL, including the reasons behind it. While there is no general obligation to publicly disclose a CRL's existence or contents, the U.S. Securities and Exchange Commission has in the past brought action against companies that allegedly misled investors about a CRL.
