= Resamirigene bilparvovec =

Experimental treatment for X-linked myotubular myopathy

Gene therapy
- Target gene: MTM1
- Vector: Adeno-associated virus serotype 8

Clinical data
- Other names: AT132
- Routes of administration: Intravascular

Identifiers
- CAS Number: 2085240-27-1
- DrugBank: DB16779
- UNII: F6LOJ6ER4S

Resamirigene bilparvovec (codename: AT132) is an experimental gene therapy medication studied as a treatment for X-linked myotubular myopathy (XLMTM), a severe and usually fatal genetic disorder affecting mainly male infants and caused by a mutation in the MTM1 gene. The drug consists of a MTM1 transgene encapsulated in a viral vector from the adeno-associated virus class (AAV8) and is administered to affected children as an intravenous infusion.

The treatment is being developed by Astellas Gene Therapies and is currently in a phase I/II clinical trial in the United States. As of October 2021, four children had died in the trial after experiencing liver failure linked to the treatment, and the trial has been placed on clinical hold by the U.S. Food and Drug Administration.
