= Elivaldogene autotemcel =

Gene therapy medication

Clinical data
- Trade names: Skysona
- Other names: Lenti-D, eli-cel
- License data: US DailyMed: Elivaldogene autotemcel
- Routes of administration: Intravenous
- ATC code: A16AX21 (WHO)

Legal status
- Legal status: US: ℞-only; EU: Rx-only

Identifiers
- DrugBank: DB16746
- UNII: KUM75TD6SG
- KEGG: D12150

Elivaldogene autotemcel, sold under the brand name Skysona, is a gene therapy used to treat cerebral adrenoleukodystrophy (CALD). It was developed by Bluebird Bio and was given breakthrough therapy designation by the US Food and Drug Administration in May 2018.

Elivaldogene autotemcel is made specifically for each recipient, using the recipient's hematopoietic stem cells.

It was approved for medical use by the U.S. Food and Drug Administration in September 2022.

== Medical uses ==
Elivaldogene autotemcel is indicated for the treatment of people with early, active CALD in boys aged 4 to 17 for whom a matched hematopoietic stem cell donor is not available. Early, active CALD refers to asymptomatic or mildly symptomatic boys with gadolinium enhancement on brain MRI and a Loes score of 0.5-9, a scale that rates the severity of CALD white matter lesions on a scale of 0 (normal) to 34 (abnormal) in adrenoleukodystrophy.

Elivaldogene autotemcel is a form of autologous hematopoietic stem cell therapy where stem cells are mobilized and collected from the patient and genetically modified to carry a functional copy of the ABCD1 gene using a lentiviral vector. Patients undergo myeloablative chemotherapy conditioning to kill stem cells in the bone marrow before infusion with elivaldogene autotemcel, which allows their modified stem cells to replace stem cells lacking a functional copy of the ABCD1 gene.

Elivaldogene autotemcel is a one-time treatment given as an autologous intravenous infusion. Dose depends on the patient's body weight. One infusion of elivaldogene autotemcel is expected to last for a patient's lifetime; follow-up studies have shown that 90% of patients have reached 24 months of major functional disabilities (MFD)-free survival, and 14 patients have reached their five-year follow-up visit MFD-free.

== Mechanism of action ==
Cerebral adrenoleukodystrophy is caused by a mutation in the ABCD1 gene on the X chromosome, which codes for the ALD protein that helps transport very long chain fatty acids (VLCFAs) to peroxisomes for degradation. Patients with a dysfunctional ABCD1 gene lack a functional ALD protein, causing VLCFAs to improperly degrade and abnormally accumulate in the blood and central nervous system. Improperly degraded VLCFAs cross the blood-brain barrier and incorporate inappropriately in the white matter, causing myelin damage. ABCD1 deficient macrophages and microglia cannot degrade VLCFAs from damaged myelin, causing further neurotoxicity. Treatment with elivaldogene autotemcel adds functional copies of the ABCD1 gene using a lentiviral vector, which integrates the functional gene into the stem cell genome. Modified bone marrow replaces dysfunctional bone marrow with elivaldogene autotemcel infusion, which allows differentiated hematopoietic cells to breakdown VLCFAs in the blood and brain, slowing or stabilizing the progression of CALD.

== Adverse effects ==
Elivaldogene autotemcel has a black box warning for hematological cancers, as patients have developed myelodysplastic syndrome (MDS) due to lentiviral integration into proto-oncogenes. Patients must be monitored with a complete blood count once every six months for fifteen years after treatment for evidence of MDS. Serious opportunistic infections have occurred, including cytomegalovirus reactivation, candidiasis, and bacteremia. Patients have exhibited prolonged cytopenias, including pancytopenia, over one year following infusion. Patients may exhibit hypersensitivity reactions, including anaphylaxis, due to dimethyl sulfoxide in elivaldogene autotemcel.

In November 2024 the FDA began investigating further reports of blood cancers after treatment. By July 2025, hematologic malignancies, including myelodysplastic syndrome and acute myeloid leukemia, had been diagnosed in 10 of 67 clinical trial participants (15%), compared with 3 at approval. In August 2025 the FDA required label changes stating that Skysona should be used only in patients without suitable alternative treatment, and recommended lifelong monitoring.

The most common adverse effects during mobilization and conditioning include nausea (79%), vomiting (72%), anorexia (42%), catheter site pain (39%), constipation (30%), headache (24%), abdominal pain (21%), and rash (13%). The most common side effects in the first 60 days after treatment include mucositis (88%), febrile neutropenia (73%), alopecia (72%), abdominal pain (33%), vomiting (31%), anorexia (31%), pyrexia (27%), nausea (27%), constipation (21%), diarrhea (21%), epistaxis (19%), pruritis (18%), headache (16%), oropharyngeal pain (16%), skin hyperpigmentation (16%), and anxiety (15%). The most common side effects between 60 days and 1 year after treatment include pyrexia (9%) and vomiting (6%). The most common side effects 1 year after treatment include seizure (15%) and myelodysplastic syndrome (6%).

== History ==
Elivaldogene autotemcel was designated an orphan drug by the European Medicines Agency (EMA) in 2012.

Elivaldogene autotemcel was granted orphan drug, rare pediatric disease, and breakthrough therapy designations by the US Food and Drug Administration (FDA). In September 2022, elivaldogene autotemcel was granted accelerated approval.

On 20 May 2021, the Committee for Medicinal Products for Human Use (CHMP) of the European Medicines Agency (EMA) recommended the granting of a marketing authorization for elivaldogene autotemcel. The applicant was Bluebird Bio (Netherlands) B.V. In July 2021, the European Commission approved elivaldogene autotemcel under the tradename Skysona for CALD patients who have certain genetic mutations and don't have a sibling who is a match for a stem cell transplant.

In July 2021, after receiving marketing authorization through the EMA, bluebird bio reported it planned to close operations and clinical trials in Europe, citing an inability to come to an agreement regarding reimbursement for therapy cost. This decision came after the withdrawal of Zynteglo, a gene therapy for severe beta thalassemia, from Germany in 2021 due to similar difficulties in reaching reimbursement agreements.

The first commercial infusion with elivaldogene autotemcel was completed in March 2023.

== Society and culture ==
=== Names ===
Elivaldogene autotemcel is the recommended international nonproprietary name (INN).

=== Pricing ===
One course of treatment with elivaldogene autotemcel costs $3.0 million. Its $3 million price was a record at its US approval in September 2022. Several gene therapies have since launched at higher prices, including Hemgenix ($3.5 million) and Lenmeldy ($4.25 million, 2024).
