= Prescription Drug User Fee Act =

Legislation in the United States

- Long title: An Act to amend the Federal Food, Drug, and Cosmetic Act to authorize human drug application, prescription drug establishment, and prescription drug product fees and for other purposes.
- Acronyms (colloquial): PDUFA, DSA
- Nicknames: Dietary Supplement Act of 1992
- Enacted by: the 102nd United States Congress
- Effective: October 29, 1992

Citations
- Public law: 102-571
- Statutes at Large: 106 Stat. 4491

Codification
- Acts amended: Federal Food, Drug and Cosmetic Act
- Titles amended: 21 U.S.C.: Food and Drugs
- U.S.C. sections amended: 21 U.S.C. ch. 9, subch. VII § 379g et seq.

Legislative history
- Introduced in the House as H.R. 6181 by John Dingell (D–MI) on October 6, 1992; Committee consideration by House Energy and Commerce; Passed the House on October 6, 1992 (passed without objection); Passed the Senate on October 7, 1992 (passed voice vote); Signed into law by President George H. W. Bush on October 29, 1992

The Prescription Drug User Fee Act (PDUFA) was a law passed by the United States Congress in 1992 which allowed the Food and Drug Administration (FDA) to collect fees from drug manufacturers to fund the new drug approval process. The Act provided that the FDA was entitled to collect a substantial application fee from drug manufacturers at the time a New Drug Application (NDA) or Biologics License Application (BLA) was submitted, with those funds designated for use only in Center for Drug Evaluation and Research (CDER) or Center for Biologics Evaluation and Research (CBER) drug approval activities. In order to continue collecting such fees, the FDA is required to meet certain performance benchmarks, primarily related to the speed of certain activities within the NDA review process.

== History ==
The move towards imposing user fees to pay for the regulatory review of new medicines was the result of dissatisfaction among consumers, industry, and the FDA. All three groups felt that drug approvals were taking far too long. Pharmaceutical companies had to wait to begin to recoup the costs of research and development. The FDA estimated that a delay of one month in a review’s completion cost its sponsor $10 million. The FDA argued that it needed additional staff to end its back-log of drugs awaiting approval for market. The FDA had not received sufficient appropriations from Congress to hire them. For decades the FDA had asked for permission to implement user fees and the pharmaceutical industry generally opposed them, fearing that the funds would not be used to speed drug review. The 1992 law became possible when the FDA and industry agreed on setting target completion times for reviews and the promise these fees would supplement federal appropriations instead of replacing them.

=== AIDS epidemic ===
The length of the drug approval process fell under severe scrutiny during the early years of the AIDS epidemic. In the late 1980s, ACT-UP and other HIV activist organizations accused the FDA of unnecessarily delaying the approval of medications to fight HIV and opportunistic infections, and staged large protests, such as a confrontational October 11, 1988, action at the FDA headquarters which resulted in roughly 180 arrests. In August 1990, Louis Lasagna, then chairman of a presidential advisory panel on drug approval, estimated that thousands of lives were lost each year due to delays in approval and marketing of drugs for cancer and AIDS. Partly in response to these criticisms, the FDA introduced expedited approval of drugs for life-threatening diseases and expanded pre-approval access to drugs for patients with limited treatment options. All of the initial drugs approved for the treatment of HIV/AIDS were approved through accelerated approval mechanisms. For example, a "treatment IND" was issued for the first HIV drug, AZT, in 1985, and approval was granted 2 years later, in 1987.

AIDS activists, desperate for new treatments, were outraged at the cost of those first drugs and the slow pace of drug development. These activists bombarded the government and drug companies with complaints and public protests. The activists won a major victory in 1989, when Burroughs Wellcome implemented a 20% price cut on AZT, then still the only treatment for HIV. Even after this price concession, the 12-pill-per-day AZT regimen cost patients $6,400 a year. AIDS activists expressed their anger by trashing booths at medical conventions and continuing vocal public protests. Gradually, drug companies established relationships with AIDS activists and the two sides came together to improve clinical trials. By August 1991, relations had warmed up so much that ACT-UP founder Larry Kramer wrote Bristol-Myers Squibb chief Richard Gelb a letter of congratulations on the imminent approval of Videx. AIDS groups fought for the reauthorization of the Orphan Drug Act and the passage of the Prescription Drug User Fee Act in 1992.

=== PDUFA I ===
The Prescription Drug User Fee Act (PDUFA) was first enacted in 1992. PDUFA gives the Food and Drug Administration (FDA) a revenue source, fees paid by pharmaceutical companies seeking the approval of new drugs, to supplement but not replace direct appropriations from Congress. PDUFA was passed in order to shorten the length of time from a manufacturer’s submission of a New Drug Application or a Biologics License Application to an FDA decision approval or licensure.

Congress created three kinds of user fees via PDUFA and required that they each make up one-third of the total fees collected. These include application review fees paid by the sponsor for each drug or biologic application submitted, establishment fees paid by manufacturers annually for each of its facilities, and product fees paid annually for each product on the market covered by PDUFA. For 1993, the application review fee was about $100,000. The law provided exemptions and waivers for applications from small businesses, drugs aimed at orphan diseases, or unmet public health needs.

In order to avoid listing specific performance goals in statutory language Congress stated in the bill’s “Findings” that, "3) the fees authorized by this title will be dedicated toward expediting the review of human drug applications as set forth in the goals identified in the letters of September 14, 1992, and September 21, 1992, from the Commissioner of Food and Drugs to the Chairman of the Energy and Commerce Committee of the House of Representatives and the Chairman of the Labor and Human Resources Committee of the Senate, as set forth at 138 Cong. Rec. H9099-H9100 (daily ed. September 22, 1992)."

=== PDUFA II ===
In its 1997 reauthorization of PDUFA, Congress enacted stricter performance goals, required increased transparency in the drug review process, and tried to facilitate better communication between drug makers and patient advocacy groups. Congress expanded the scope of the legislation to include the investigational phases of a new drug’s development. PDUFA II was passed as Title I of the Food and Drug Administration Modernization Act.

When Congress was debating the legislation that implemented PDUFA II Rep. Billy Tauzin, who later became head of PhRMA and one of those leading the call for a further streamlined review process, told a story of how a family friend had to travel to Mexico to obtain drugs that helped him overcome prostate cancer. "We continue to have problems with the fact that approved medicines in other countries can't get approved here. But what I particularly can't understand at all are situations where you have people suffering terminal illnesses, and they can't get the experimental drugs that might save their lives."

In testimony before Congress, James Swire, an AIDS activist and health educator who became infected with HIV in 1990, said the FDA has dramatically reduced the time needed to approve life-saving drugs using the money from PDUFA. Swire said, "I'm here because people really pushed the review process for AIDS and HIV treatments. There still is not a cure, but because of some of the new drugs, a lot of us have been able to get back to work."

=== PDUFA III ===
PDUFA III, part of the Public Health and Bioterrorism Preparedness Act, made appropriations for increased postmarket monitoring of new products and allowed the FDA to hire additional personnel to speed the reviews of new drugs. Another 2002 statute extended user fee policies to cover the approval process for medical devices.

During the period that PDUFA III was in effect the FDA's requirement that drug companies pay user fees for 505(b)(2) applications to switch drugs from requiring a prescription to being sold over-the-counter became a source of controversy. The drug industry claimed that the FDA misinterpreted the section of PDUFA III authorizing user fees when deciding to charge for reviewing 505(b)(2) applications. Specifically, they said Congress only intended user fees to be paid on new indications for a new active ingredient and that switching a drug to over-the-counter status was an exception to the rule requiring user fees.

In February 2007 the FDA exempted drugs used in the President's Emergency Plan for AIDS Relief (PEPFAR) from user fees in order to reduce the financial burden of developing new AIDS drugs.

=== PDUFA IV ===
The FDA requested and received fee increases to cover increased reviewer workload and expanded post-marketing safety initiatives, as well as the authority to apply user fees to the monitoring of direct-to-consumer drug advertising. President Bush signed the reauthorization of PDUFA into law on 27 September 2007.

In 2007, the FDA was expected to collect $259,300,000 in industry user fees.

=== PDUFA V ===
The reauthorization process for PDUFA V began with a public hearing in April 2010. The Pharmaceutical Research and Manufacturers of America (PhRMA) strongly supported reauthorization of PDUFA, saying at the time that “PDUFA V can play a critical role in making more life-saving medicines available to patients in a timely manner, strengthening the scientific base of the FDA and providing a steady, reliable stream of resources for Agency scientists."

PDUFA was reauthorized in July 2012. PDUFA's fifth reauthorization calls for upgrading benefit/risks assessments of new medicines as well as call for more patient perspectives in the review process.

=== PDUFA VI ===
On August 18, 2017, President Trump signed into law the Food and Drug Administration Reauthorization Act (FDARA), which includes the reauthorization of PDUFA through September 2022. PDUFA VI will provide for the continued timely review of new drug and biologic license applications.

== Effectiveness ==
=== Increased staffing ===
A 2002 U.S. Government Accountability Office (GAO) report found that PDUFA funds allowed the FDA to increase the number of new drug reviewers by 77 percent in the first eight years of the act, and the median approval time for non-priority new drugs dropped from 27 months to 14 months over the same period.

=== Review times ===
A major PDUFA goal is for the FDA to review and provide a ruling on applications within one year unless significant changes are made to the application during the last three months of the review cycle. In a 1997 speech given prior to leaving the FDA David Kessler said, "So far we have reviewed 95% of the 1995 group on time. We won't reach 100%, however, because we did make a mistake: we misread a deadline on a computer printout and we missed one deadline by three days." The PDUFA goal for the 1995 group called for a 70% on-time record. The 95% on-time rate more than doubled the pre-PDUFA on-time level of about 40%. Kessler said the FDA achieved similar positive results with other PDUFA goals, including in its review time for efficacy supplements (requests to add a new indication or a new group of patients to an already approved drug), submissions for manufacturing supplements (for making significant changes in the way a drug is made or using a new manufacturing facility) and resubmissions (responses provided to questions or alleged deficiencies raised by the FDA).

From 1993 through 1996, the years PDUFA I was in effect, the approval time for new drugs declined significantly while the number of new products increased. The approval time for NDAs in the 8 years before the implementation of PDUFA I was roughly 31.3 months. During this period, the approval time exceeded 30 months in every year except 1990 when it was 27.7 months and 1992 when it was 29.9 months. From 1993 through 1996, the average approval time fell to 20.8 months. During this period, the approval time for new drugs never exceeded 30 months. According to the Pharmaceutical Research and Manufacturers of America drug review time was cut roughly in half after the passage of PDUFA I.

=== Drug launches ===
Faster drug approval times and other PDUFA-related changes have led to pharmaceutical companies targeting more drugs for first launch in the United States thus increasing patient access to new medicines. Faster drug review from 1990 to 2001 were found to increase the probability of a drug being launched first in the United States by 14%. Other changes made under PDUFA such as the increased probability of approval and shortened development periods increased the probability of a drug being first launched in the United States by 31 percent at the end of PDUFA I and 27 percent at the end of PDUFA II.

During the eight years before PDUFA took effect, an average of 24 new drugs were approved each year. The number of approvals ranged from 20 in 1988 to 30 in 1991. During the four years that PDUFA I was in effect, an average of 32 drugs were approved each year, ranging from 22 in 1994 to 53 in 1996. The average number of new drugs approved by the FDA each year increased by one-third.

First drug launches making use of new chemical entities in the United States increased from 44 from 1982 through 1992 to 156 in from 1993 through 2003 period. The increase in first drug launches in the United States from 1993 through 2003 is particularly interesting given that the European Union harmonized its regulatory regime for new drugs with those of other major markets in order to reduce barriers for drug approvals during the same period.

=== Regulator-industry communication ===
David Kessler described improved communication between the FDA and the drug industry on what data should be included in NDAs as an important benefit of PDUFA. He said, "For example, in fiscal year 1993, 34 of the new applications that came into the FDA were sent back to the company because they were poorly prepared or missing critical information. In fiscal year 1996 six applications were refused for these reasons – a more than fivefold improvement."

== PDUFA dates ==
The FDA's deadline to issue a decision on a given NDA or BLA is colloquially referred to as the "PDUFA date". The FDA is normally given 10 months to review drug applications. If an application is selected for Priority Review, the FDA is allotted 6 months to review the drug. These time frames begin on the date that the NDA or BLA is accepted by the FDA as complete.

== Scale of fees ==
FDA calculates fees based on an annual basis. For fiscal year 2021, drug application fees are:

$3,117,218 per full application requiring clinical data,
$1,558,609 per application not requiring clinical data or per supplement requiring clinical data.
$369,413 for programs

The FDA estimates that operating costs for the year 2017 will be $878,590,000. The FD&C Act specifies that one-third of the total fee revenue is to be derived from application fees, one-third from establishment fees, and one-third from product fees (see section 736(b)(2) of the FD&C Act). FDA estimates that in 2016, 2,646 products will have been billed for product fees and 523 establishments will have been billed for establishment fees.

In 2015, 132.5 full application equivalents (FAEs) were charged an application fee. FAEs are calculated by counting a full application as one FAE and an application not requiring clinical data or a clinical data supplement as half an FAE. An application that is withdrawn, or refused for filing, counts as one quarter of the original FAE. For a full application this is one quarter FAE, and for an application without clinical data or a clinical data supplement this is an eighth of an FAE.

== FDA budget ==
User fees imposed under PDUFA are expected to add $707 million to the FDA budget in 2011, roughly a quarter of the agency's total spending. User fees cover roughly 65 percent of the drug approval process.
