= OPAT =

OPAT may refer to:

- Tunisian Civil Aviation and Airports Authority
- Outpatient parenteral antibiotic therapy
