= PDUFA date =

In the US, due date for the FDA's response to new drug applications

In United States pharmaceutical regulatory practice, the PDUFA date is the colloquial name for the date by which the Food and Drug Administration (FDA) must respond to a New Drug Application (NDA) or a Biologics License Application (BLA). It is part of the regime established by the Prescription Drug User Fee Act (PDUFA) to ensure funding of the FDA's drug approval activities in return for adhering to a largely fixed timetable of regulatory actions.

== History ==
Prior to the enactment of the PDUFA, median approval times for NDAs ranged between 21 and 29 months. The PDUFA was first passed in 1992 to facilitate the funding of the FDA while ensuring a more predictable timetable for drug approvals. Under the PDUFA regime, NDAs and BLAs (together referred to as 'human drug applications' in the PDUFA context) are levied a fee upon filing. As of 2021, this fee was US$2,875,842 for applications that require clinical data and US$1,437,921 for applications that do not. In return, the FDA strives to complete review of applications within 10 months for most applications and 6 months for priority reviews. The PDUFA date thus serves as a 'best estimate' as to when a decision on an NDA or BLA will be made. This response may be a decision to approve the application or a Complete Response Letter (CRL).

The PDUFA date may be extended by the FDA in certain circumstances. These include circumstances such as a 'major amendment', e.g. where data submitted to a final study report is updated or data inadvertently omitted is supplied.

The PDUFA must be reauthorized by an act of Congress every five years. The current (as of 2026) version, PDUFA VII, was included in the FDA User Fee Reauthorization Act of 2022 that was signed into law on September 30 of that year. The reauthorization will expire in September 2027.

== Relevance ==
The PDUFA date serves as a good approximation of when a final decision on drug approval can be expected. Sponsors frequently publish PDUFA dates for their pending applications, and while there is no official list of PDUFA dates, several websites collect PDUFA dates from press announcements in a calendar form.
