= Nextcell Pharma AB =

Swedish biopharmaceutical company

NextCell Pharma AB
- Type: Public company
- Traded as: Nasdaq First North Growth Market: NXTCL; ISIN: SE0009723125
- Industry: Biotechnology, biopharmaceutical
- Founded: March 19, 2014; 12 years ago (as Cellaviva AB)
- Founders: Mathias Svahn; Edvard Smith; Hans-Peter Ekre; Lena Degling Wilkingsson
- Headquarters: Hälsovägen 7, Huddinge, Sweden
- Key people: Mathias Svahn (CEO); Hans-Peter Ekre (Chairman)
- Products: ProTrans (drug candidate); Cellaviva (stem cell banking); QVance (ATMP manufacturing services)
- Website: nextcellpharma.com

NextCell Pharma AB is a Swedish biopharmaceutical company headquartered in Huddinge, in the Flemingsberg life-science cluster south of Stockholm. The company develops allogeneic mesenchymal stromal cell (MSC) therapies, with its lead candidate aimed at preserving insulin production in newly diagnosed type 1 diabetes. Alongside its drug development programme, NextCell operates a private umbilical cord stem cell bank (Cellaviva) and a contract manufacturing and analytical services subsidiary for Advanced Therapy Medicinal Products (QVance). NextCell's shares trade on the Nasdaq First North Growth Market in Stockholm under the ticker NXTCL.

== History ==
The idea behind the company came when Mathias Svahn had his first child, and he noticed that at the time there was no way to store stem cells during childbirth. He drafted a business plan for private cord-blood bank in 2012, and the company was formally established on 19 March 2014 as Cellaviva AB, after securing financing and obtaining a tissue establishment permit from Swedish regulators. Along with Svahn, the founding team included molecular medicine professor Edvard Smith, Hans-Peter Ekre, and Lena Degling Wilkingsson.

In 2016, the company renamed itself NextCell Pharma AB to reflect its expansion into drug development based on mesenchymal stromal cells. Cellaviva was retained as a subsidiary brand for the banking business, and is currently the largest private stem cell bank in Scandinavia.

NextCell's shares were initially traded on the Spotlight Stock Market. The company moved to the Nasdaq First North Growth Market on 22 July 2020, with FNCA Sweden AB acting as its Certified Adviser; the ticker (NXTCL) and ISIN carried over from the earlier listing.

In 2024, NextCell established its own Good Manufacturing Practice (GMP) facility to produce material for planned phase III trials in-house, and launched a second subsidiary, QVance, to offer GMP manufacturing and analytical services to other companies in the Flemingsberg biotech cluster.

During 2026 the company expanded internationally, opening a subsidiary office in Hong Kong and joining the Hong Kong–Shenzhen Innovation and Technology Park as a founding partner of the Nordic Future Health Pavilion at the BIOHK 2026 conference. In August 2026, NextCell was Sweden's only representative in the EU–Japan Biotech Business Mission 2026. On May 2026, the company began referring to its cell-therapy development platform by the name NXTCL.

== Products and pipeline ==
=== ProTrans ===
NextCell's lead candidate, ProTrans, is an allogeneic mesenchymal stromal cell therapy manufactured from donated umbilical cord tissue using a patented selection algorithm. MSCs are thought to modulate immune activity through secreted signalling molecules, and NextCell has investigated ProTrans primarily as a potential disease-modifying treatment for newly diagnosed type 1 diabetes, aiming to preserve residual insulin (C-peptide) production. The company has also discussed potential applications in other autoimmune and inflammatory conditions, including Crohn's disease, multiple sclerosis and rheumatic disease.

Clinical development of ProTrans in type 1 diabetes has included several studies:

- ProTrans-1 / ProTrans-2 — a Phase I/II randomised, double-blind, placebo-controlled trial in adults with newly diagnosed type 1 diabetes, evaluating safety and effects on endogenous insulin production. Results were published in a peer-reviewed journal in 2023.
- ProTrans-Repeat and ProTrans-Obs — long-term follow-up and repeat-dosing studies. The company has reported multi-year follow-up data, including a January 2026 report describing six-year data (about 50% preservation of insulin-producing function, versus ~15% with placebo at five years) and a February 2026 report of seven-to-seven-and-a-half-year follow-up, with sustained preservation concentrated in the high-dose group.
- ProTrans-Young — an ongoing trial in paediatric and adolescent patients (reported enrolment of around 66 participants aged 7–21).

Beginning in 2020, NextCell also studied ProTrans in patients with severe viral pneumonia, initially in the context of COVID-19 and later expanded to cover pneumonia caused by influenza A, respiratory syncytial virus and human metapneumovirus. The main trial, conducted at Örebro University Hospital in Sweden and registered as EudraCT 2020-002078-29 (NCT04896853), completed patient treatment in February 2025, with results analysis reported as ongoing.

As of 2026, ProTrans has not received marketing authorisation from any regulatory agency; company management has stated an ambition to reach approval for the type 1 diabetes indication within a roughly ten-year horizon (as of April 2024), alongside further trials in other indications.

=== Cellaviva ===
Cellaviva is NextCell's private stem cell banking service, under which parents can arrange for stem cells from a newborn's umbilical cord to be collected and cryopreserved for potential future medical use. It is marketed as one of the largest private cord stem cell banks in Scandinavia and operates under a Swedish tissue establishment permit obtained at the company's founding in 2014.

=== QVance ===
QVance, established in 2024 as NextCell's second subsidiary, provides GMP manufacturing and analytical services for advanced therapy medicinal products (ATMPs) to third-party biotech companies, drawing on the manufacturing capacity NextCell built to supply its own clinical trials.

== Leadership ==
As of 2026, NextCell's management includes:

- Mathias Svahn — Chief Executive Officer and co-founder
- Eric Gustafsson — Chief Financial Officer (joined 2025)
- Lindsay Davies — Chief Scientific Officer and CEO of QVance (joined 2020)
- Edvard Smith — Medical Director and co-founder
- Sofie Falk Jansson — CEO of Cellaviva (joined 2018)
- Sofia Sisay — Head of Clinical Trials (joined 2022)

The board of directors is chaired by co-founder Hans-Peter Ekre, with Edvard Smith, Camilla Myhre Sandberg and Eva Sjökvist Saers as additional members.

== Finances ==
NextCell is a clinical-stage company and has not been consistently profitable. In its interim report for the first quarter of 2026, the company reported revenue of SEK 2.7 million (down from SEK 3.3 million in the prior-year period) and a net loss after financial items of SEK 10.4 million (compared with SEK 7.6 million a year earlier). Cash and cash equivalents stood at SEK 32.3 million, following a directed share issue in March 2026 that raised approximately SEK 15 million at a subscription price of SEK 1 per share. Shares outstanding totalled approximately 126.4 million at the end of the quarter.

As of 11 September 2026, NextCell shares traded at SEK 1.09 on Nasdaq First North, corresponding to a market capitalisation of roughly SEK 138 million (approximately US$14 million).

== See also ==
- Mesenchymal stem cell
- Type 1 diabetes
- Nasdaq First North
