= Sakigake (drug designation) =

Sakigake (さきがけ, lit. "pathfinder", "harbinger") is a drug designation by the Pharmaceuticals and Medical Devices Agency, the pharmaceuticals regulator of Japan. It was designed to provide easier access to novel advanced treatments. It is analogous to the Regenerative Medicine Advanced Therapy designation in the United States and the Advanced Therapy Medicinal Product designation in the European Union.

== History ==
The Sakigake designation was first announced as a pilot by the Ministry of Health, Labour and Welfare on 17 June 2014. The designation system is part of a wider strategy, also named Sakigake, to promote R&D and improve access to new pharmaceuticals. The Pharmaceutical & Medical Device Act Amendments of 2019, which entered into force on 1 September 2020, made the Sakigake designation system a permanent fixture. While application for the Sakigake designation was only open for a short period every year, the permanent Sakigake regime is open year-round.

== Effect ==
The Sakigake designation opens up the possibility for sponsors to seek pre-application consultations, which provide clients with a fixed-price multi-track review of their application.

== Statistics ==
As of 31 December 2020, 24 drugs received Sakigake designation, but only 8 of these (33.33%) were approved.
