= Center for Veterinary Medicine =

US FDA branch that regulates animal feed and medications

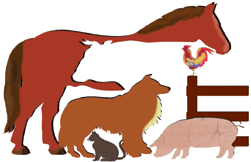

Agency overview
- Agency executive: Tracey Forfa, J.D., M. Div., Director
- Parent agency: Food and Drug Administration
- Website: www.fda.gov/animal-veterinary

The Center for Veterinary Medicine (CVM) is a branch of the U.S. Food and Drug Administration (FDA) that regulates the manufacture and distribution of food, food additives, and drugs that will be given to animals. These include animals from which human foods are derived, as well as food additives and drugs for pets or companion animals. CVM is responsible for regulating drugs, devices, and food additives given to, or used on, over one hundred million companion animals, plus millions of poultry, cattle, swine, and minor animal species. Minor animal species include animals other than cattle, swine, chickens, turkeys, horses, dogs, and cats.

CVM monitors the safety of animal foods and medications. Much of the center's work focuses on animal medications used in food animals to ensure that significant drug residues are not present in the meat or other products from these animals.

CVM does not regulate vaccines for animals; these are handled by the United States Department of Agriculture

== History ==
In 1953, a Veterinary Medical Branch of the FDA was created within the Bureau of Medicine. A separate Bureau of Veterinary Medicine (BVM) was established in 1965. At this time, the BVM included a Division of Veterinary Medical Review, Division of Veterinary New Drugs, and a Division of Veterinary Research. In 1970, the Division of Compliance and Division of Nutritional Sciences were added. The Bureau underwent reorganization in 1976 and in 1984, it was renamed the Center for Veterinary Medicine.

Dr. Steven Solomon, DVM became the Director of the Center in 2017. He received his Doctor of Veterinary Medicine (DVM) degree from Ohio State University and a Master's in Public Health from Johns Hopkins University. He succeeded Tracey Forfa, who had been acting director for a few months. The previous director was Dr. Bernadette Dunham; she served as Director from 2008 to 2016.

== Mission and vision ==
The mission of the center is "protecting human and animal health" and the vision of the organization is "Excellence. Innovation. Leadership." The organization works across multiple disciplines to promote public health.

== Office structure ==
The Center for Veterinary Medicine is divided into six key offices.

The Office of the Director coordinates activities for the center and establishes policy in a wide variety of areas, including management, research, and compliance. It directs the planning, programming, budgeting, and administrative support for the center. The Office of the Director is also responsible for approving New Animal Drug Applications and Abbreviated New Animal Drug Applications, approving the use of animal food additives, and reviewing submitted New Animal Drug Applications for effects on human health. The Director serves as the spokesperson for the center's activities and is in contact with the public, industry, other government agencies, national organizations, and international organizations.

The Office of Management provides customer service, guidance, and education on the activities of the center. Individuals in this office are in charge of managing strategic planning of the center's goals and priorities and serve as liaisons for specific facilities, programs, and services provided by the center. This office is also in charge of managing billing, information management and technology, talent development, and budget planning for the center.

The Office of New Animal Drug Evaluation reviews information submitted by drug sponsors who are working to gain approval to manufacture and market animal drugs. This office determines if an animal drug should be approved and ensures that the new drug meets four pillars: the drug product must be safe for both animals and humans, must be effective for its intended use, must be a quality manufactured product, and must be properly labeled with how to safely use, store, and handle the drug. This office also ensures that these standards are maintained after the drug enters the marketplace. The office has eight divisions which each evaluate a different part of the drug review process.

The Office of Surveillance and Compliance is in charge of regulating animal drugs and devices for their safety and effectiveness and also oversees animal food safety programs. Members of this office include veterinarians, animal scientists, toxicologists, consumer safety officers, and other scientists. The Office helps inspect products, analyze samples of products, and reviews products that may be imported into the United States. The Office conducts education and outreach about compliance, helps monitor adverse events and identify safety issues with animal drugs, animal food, and animal devices. The Office works to prevent and address any animal food hazards. If any safety concerns are found, this Office can issue product safety alerts, packaging label changes, recalls, or can withdrawal a product's approval.

The Office of Research helps to develop new procedures for analyzing drugs, food additives, and contaminants. The Office works to investigate how drugs are absorbed, distributed, metabolized, and excreted, and how different drugs impact the immunology or physiology of animals. This office also helps develop screening tests for foodborne diseases and screens for drug residues in food products. The Office is involved in many scientific areas of research including veterinary medicine, animal science, biology, chemistry, microbiology, epidemiology, and pharmacology. The building that houses this Office is equipped with laboratories, animal facilities, and has specialized experimental equipment to conduct research.

The Office of Minor Use and Minor Species is the smallest office within the Center and handles "minor use" drugs, which are those that are intended for use in horses, dogs, cats, cattle, pigs, turkey, and chickens but are for diseases that do not occur very frequently, only impact a small geographic area, or are only impacted a small number of animals each year. This Office also handles issues pertaining to "minor species" which include animals such as zoo animals, parrots, ferrets, guinea pigs, sheep, goats, and honeybees. This Office establishes and maintains the Index of Legally Marketed Unapproved New Animal Drugs for Minor Species. Outreach and education is also a significant part of this Office's activities.
