= Approvable letter =

Approvable letters, and the related non-approvable letters (alternately not-approvable letters), were notifications sent out by the Food and Drug Administration (FDA) to drug manufacturers alerting them to the approval prospects of their drugs under development. The letters were intended to let manufacturers know how much work is needed on their applications. Non-approval letters were rejections of a drug's application. Approvable and non-approvable letters were covered under Title 21 of the Code of Federal Regulations, section 314.110.

In 2018, the FDA replaced approvable letters with Complete Response Letters (CRL) to notify applicants when additional information is required before approval.

== Guidelines ==
Approvable letters were issued to applicants at the end of the FDA's review period to indicate that the application or abbreviated application was basically approvable provided that certain issues were resolved. It was an indication that the application substantially met FDA requirements if specific conditions, such as labeling changes, were agreed to. The letter described what was required by the FDA.

Applicants had 10 days after the date of the approvable letter to amend the application, notify of intent to file for an extension, withdraw the application, request a hearing or notify that they agreed to an extension.
