= Steven Rosenberg =

American cancer researcher

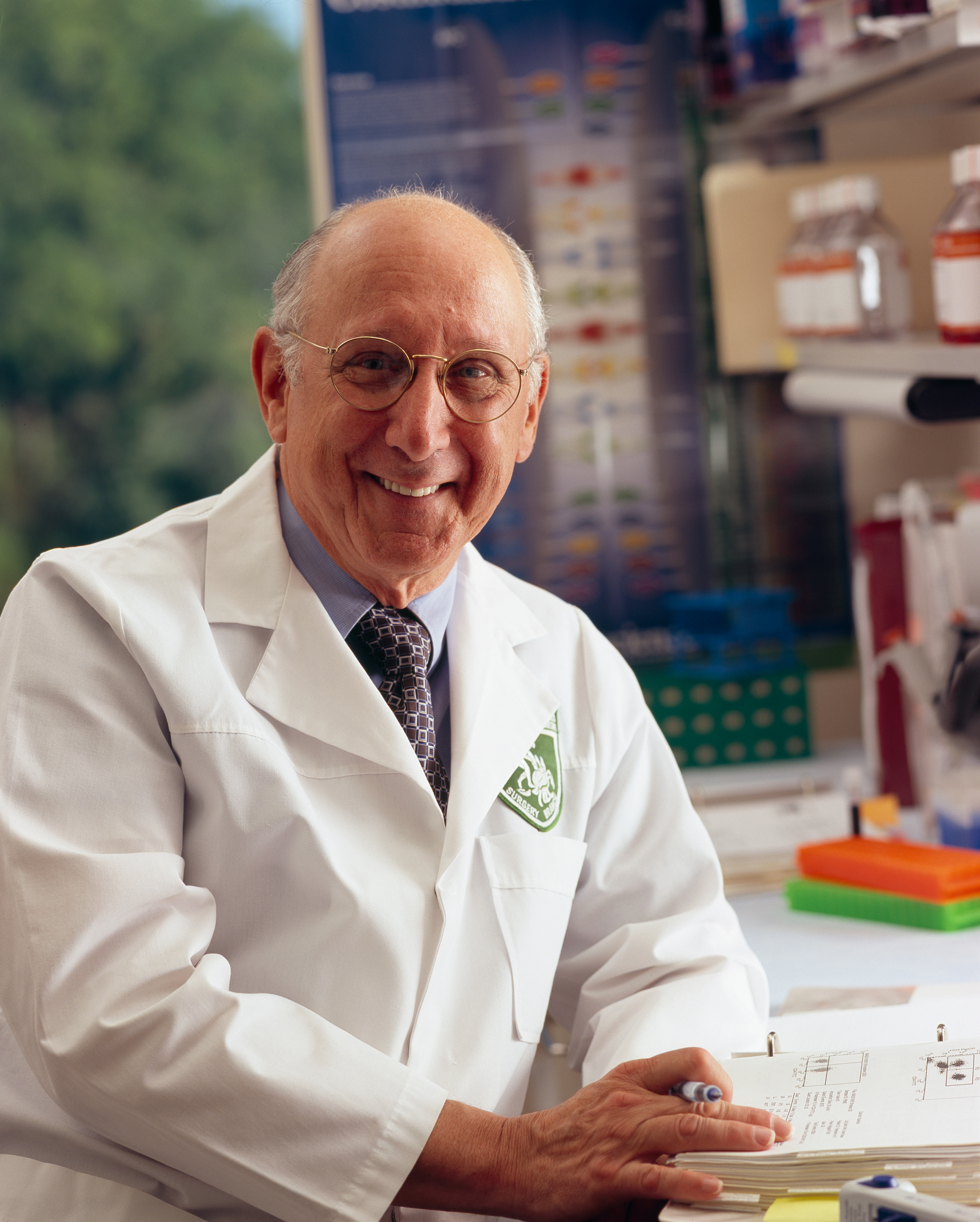
- Born: August 2, 1940 (age 86)
- Education: Johns Hopkins University; Harvard University
- Scientific career
- Thesis: The proteins of human erythrocyte membranes (1969)

Steven A. Rosenberg (born 2 August 1940) is an American cancer researcher and surgeon, chief of Surgery at the National Cancer Institute in Bethesda, Maryland and a Professor of Surgery at the Uniformed Services University of Health Sciences and the George Washington University School of Medicine and Health Sciences. He pioneered the development of immunotherapy that has resulted in the first effective immunotherapies and the development of gene therapy. He is the first researcher to successfully insert foreign genes into humans.

== Early life ==
Steven Rosenberg was born in 1940, in the Bronx, the youngest of three children of Jewish immigrants from Poland, who owned a luncheonette. He met his future wife, Alice O’Connell, during his residency at Boston's Peter Bent Brigham Hospital. She was the chief nurse at the time. They married in 1968 and have three daughters.

== Methodology ==
Rosenberg is credited with developing the use of IL-2 and immune cells for the treatment of patients with melanoma in a procedure termed adoptive cell transfer. He has shown that expanding immune cells (also known as tumor-infiltrating lymphocytes or TILs) in the lab can be used to treat patients with melanoma and has published two important studies describing their use. The first in 2002, demonstrated that some patients with advanced melanoma can be treated to complete remission with a combination of chemotherapy, immune cells and high doses of IL-2. The second, in 2006, demonstrated that the receptor of T cells can be transferred to immune cells and in combination with chemotherapy and high doses of IL-2 can be used to treat patients with melanoma. Although, this was the first time that the T cell receptor was used for gene therapy, it was not the first time that gene therapy was used in cancer. Tumor cells modified with a gene for immune growth factors such as GM-CSF, had been used many years previously and continue to be used, although the efficacy of GM-CSF modified tumor lines as a cancer vaccine remain extremely modest, at best. There has been some debate as to the role of the T cells in treating the cancer in these studies as high-dose IL-2 and chemotherapy have also been shown to have anti-cancer properties. Nevertheless, the combination of chemotherapy, T cells and high-dose IL-2 was shown to be effective even in patients who had previously failed high-dose IL-2 treatment.

Rosenberg has pioneered the use of adoptive immunotherapy.

== Education ==
Rosenberg graduated from the Bronx High School of Science. He received his B.A. (biology, 1961) and M.D. (1964) degrees from Johns Hopkins University. He served a surgical internship and residency at the Peter Bent Brigham Hospital, completing it in 1974. During his residency he also earned a Ph.D. in biophysics from Harvard University with thesis titled The proteins of human erythrocyte membranes (in 1968/1969). Following the completion of his surgical residency, he became the Chief of Surgery at the National Cancer Institute, a position he continues to hold. His research has focused on the immunotherapy of cancer.

== Awards and honors ==
- 1988 Leopold Griffuel Prize
- 1992 Golden Plate Award of the American Academy of Achievement
- 2011 William B. Coley Award for Distinguished Research in Tumor Immunology of the Cancer Research Institute
- 2013 Keio Medical Science Prize
- 2015 Medal of Honor of the American Cancer Society
- 2018 Albany Medical Center Prize in Medicine and Biomedical Research
- 2019 Edogawa NICHE Prize
- 2019 Szent-Györgyi Prize for Progress in Cancer Research
- 2021 Dan David Prize
- 2022 Pezcoller Foundation-AACR International Award for Extraordinary Achievements in Cancer Research
- 2023 Clarivate Citation Laureates
- 2023 National Medal of Technology and Innovation

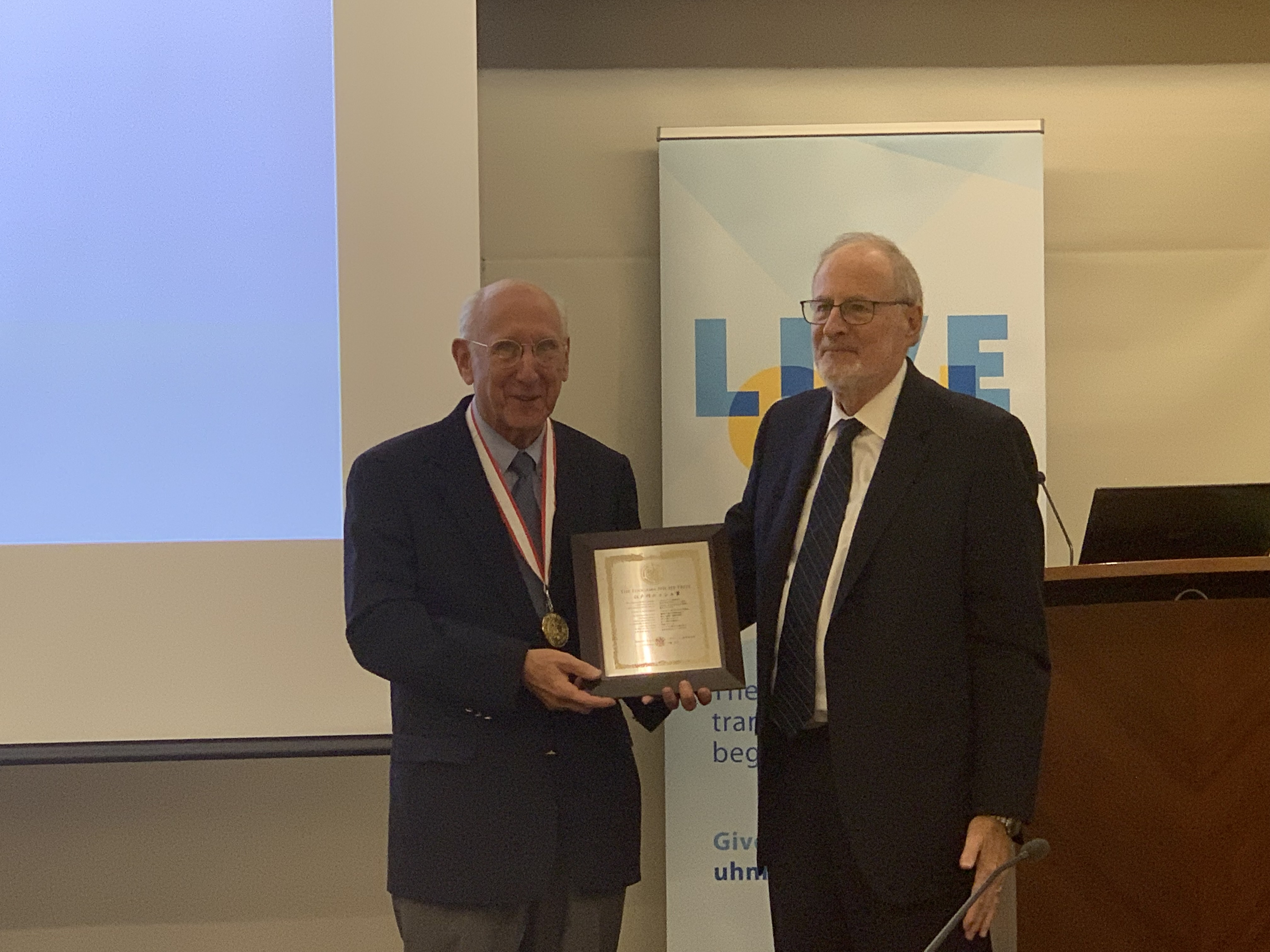
Dr. Steven Rosenberg with Prof. Gary Levy, Edogawa NICHE Prize Ceremony, Toronto, 2019

- 2026 Tang Prize in the category "Biopharmaceutical Science".

== See also ==
- Cell therapy
- Chimeric antigen receptor
- Immunotherapy
- Iovance Biotherapeutics
