= Lindsay Rosenwald =

American businessman

Personal details
- Education: Pennsylvania State University, Temple University
- Occupation: Businessman; investor

Lindsay A. Rosenwald is an American doctor, biotechnology and life sciences industry investor. He is the co-founder of the healthcare private equity firm Opus Point Partners. Rosenwald has created and sold several biotechnological companies. In 2013 he established Fortress Biotech.

Medicines his companies developed have been approved by the United States Food and Drug Administration as well as in foreign countries, such as Mexico or Canada. One medicine was approved for acute promyelocytic leukemia, a routinely fatal disease. This medicine has cured many thousands of incurable patients over the last decade, marking a significant change to how this disease is treated. One of his start-ups also developed a prostate cancer medicine. That company acquired $1 billion after Phase 2 studies. Other approved medicines include meds for schizophrenia, fibromyalgia, obesity, influenza, and infant respiratory distress syndrome.

== Early life ==
Rosenwald graduated from Abington Senior High School, located in southeast Pennsylvania, in 1973 and went on to graduate from Pennsylvania State University with a major in Finance and Economy in 1977, graduating Beta Gamma Sigma. Then he worked as an independent management consultant for healthcare companies from 1977 to 1979 before entering Temple University at their School of Medicine. After graduating from Temple in 1983, Rosenwald interned at Abington Medical Hospital and remained in private medical practice until 1986. At that time, he moved to Wall Street to serve as a physician and financial analyst.

== Career ==
In 1988, Lindsay A. Rosenwald became a managing director of corporate finance for D.H. Blair & Co., a privately owned investment firm headed by J. Morton Davis. D.H. Blair underwrote hundreds of companies, many in the biotechnology industry. Several D.H. Blair brokers were indicted for fraud, and the firm was shut down. Rosenwald headed a team of three physician-financiers who searched in the medical community for the latest developments that could be marketed with the help of private investment. They got in touch with hospitals, medical schools, pharmaceutical companies, universities, scientific firms and research groups.

In 1991, Rosenwald founded Paramount Bio Capital, where he dealt with the fields of bioresearch and biotechnology. Since 1992, he has become a NASD-member dealer. In 1995, Paramount Capital Investments LLC, a merchant and investment bank, was founded. Paramount Capital Asset Management, Inc., owned by Rosenwald, managed the investments of several funds specializing in the technology and biotechnology sectors since 1994. Rosenwald also serves as a member of the Columbia-Presbyterian Health Sciences Advisory Counsel.

Rosenwald was number one in the 2002 edition of Genetic Engineering News' 100 Molecular Millionaires. Since 2002, Rosenwald was in the board of directors for Keryx Biopharmaceuticals, Inc., which he resigned in 2006 to devote more time to the biotechnology market.

Cougar Biotechnology, another company founded by Rosenwald, was purchased by Johnson & Johnson in 2009 based solely on abiraterone acetate. This drug was not yet in phase III clinical trials for its application in prostate cancer treatment and therapy but was so promising that Johnson & Johnson bid & purchased the company in a "short-term merger" for approximately $1 billion.

In addition to his activities, which have provided capital and funding to many portfolio companies, Rosenwald also started the Rosenwald Foundation. This nonprofit organization has provided millions of dollars to support various scientific and medical education institutions.

In 2009, Rosenwald and Michael S. Weiss founded a new company called OpusPoint Partners. This company specializes in healthcare and life sciences investments and consulting. In October 2010, he invested in securities in National Holdings Corporation purchasing approximately 23.6% of NHC.
