= Mustang Bio =

Mustang Bio Inc.
- Company type: Public
- Traded as: Nasdaq: MBIO
- Industry: Biopharmaceuticals
- Founded: 2015
- Headquarters: Worcester, MA
- Key people: Manuel Litchman (CEO)
- Website: mustangbio.com

Mustang Bio is an American clinical-stage biopharmaceutical company founded in 2015 and headquartered in Worcester, MA, U.S. Operating as a partner company of Fortress Biotech, Mustang Bio develops CAR-T immunotherapies and gene therapies for multiple diseases, including hematologic cancers, solid tumors, and X-linked severe combined immunodeficiency (X-SCID).

== History ==
Mustang Bio was founded in 2015 and in the same year became a partner company of Fortress Biotech. In April 2017, Manuel Litchman took over as CEO of Mustang Bio, and in October of the same year, the company signed a lease with the University of Massachusetts Medicine Science Park in Worcester, MA, for a manufacturing facility to support the clinical development and commercialization of CAR-T products for glioblastoma and acute myeloid leukemia.

Until 2018, the company's studies focused mainly on cancer-fighting therapies and cell therapies. After licensing a gene therapy for X-SCID from St Jude Children's Research Hospital, Mustang Bio expanded its efforts to immunodeficiency treatments. In April 2019, it was announced that the gene therapy developed by St. Jude's showed positive results in a trial involving eight infants suffering from X-SCID. Mustang Bio expects to fully take over the trial from St Jude by 2020.

In May 2019, Mustang Bio raised $32 million in an underwritten public offering to fund its continued development of products for the treatment of blood cancers, solid tumors, and rare genetic diseases.

== Therapies and treatments ==
Alongside the X-SCID therapy developed in partnership with St Jude (MB-107), Mustang Bio is conducting research and trials on CAR-T therapies for several diseases, including glioblastoma (MB-101, partnered with City of Hope National Medical Center), acute myeloid leukemia (MB-102, partnered with City of Hope National Medical Center), and non-Hodgkin lymphoma and chronic lymphocytic leukemia (MB-106, with Fred Hutchinson Cancer Research Center).

In May 2019, an oncolytic virus licensed from Nationwide Children's Hospital for the treatment of malignant glioma (MB-108) was granted Orphan Drug status by the Food and Drug Administration. Also in May 2019, the company began recruiting patients for a trial at City of Hope for the treatment of patients with multiple myeloma (MB-104).

In August 2019, Mustang Bio entered into a license agreement with CSL Behring for the Cytegrity stable producer cell line.
