= Genetix Biotherapeutics =

American pharmaceutical company

- Formerly: Genetix Pharmaceuticals, Inc. (1992-2010) bluebird bio, Inc. (2010-2025)
- Type: Privately-held company
- Industry: Biotechnology; Pharmaceutical industry
- Founded: April 16, 1992; 34 years ago
- Headquarters: Somerville, Massachusetts, U.S.
- Key people: David Meek (CEO)
- Products: Lyfgenia, Skysona, Zynteglo
- Owner: Investment funds managed by The Carlyle Group and SK Capital Partners
- Number of employees: 248 (January 31, 2025)
- Website: https://www.genetixbiotx.com/

Genetix Biotherapeutics Inc., headquartered in Somerville, Massachusetts, is a privately held, commercial-stage biotechnology company developing and commercializing genetic medicine for rare disease with a focus in hematology. Formerly known as bluebird bio, the company has three FDA-approved one-time gene addition cell therapies for sickle cell disease, transfusion-dependent β-thalassemia, and cerebral adrenoleukodystrophy.

The company’s treatments are based on an ex vivo lentiviral vector gene-addition approach in which a patient’s hematopoietic stem cells are collected, genetically modified outside the body to address the underlying cause of disease, and later reinfused following preparative chemotherapy.

By 2023, the company had received U.S. Food and Drug Administration approval for Lyfgenia, Zynteglo, and Skysona. Zynteglo was the first FDA-approved cell-based gene therapy for patients with β-thalassemia who require regular red blood cell transfusions.

== History ==
Genetix Pharmaceuticals (1992-2010)

Founded in 1992, Genetix Pharmaceuticals emerged from academic research with a focus on developing one-time genetic medicines for severe genetic diseases. The company was officially incorporated in Delaware on April 16, 1992.

Its research focused on ex vivo lentiviral vector gene addition cell therapy for severe genetic diseases. Preclinical studies in the field in the early 2000s reported correction of sickle cell disease in transgenic mouse models and therapeutic hemoglobin synthesis in β-thalassemic mice.

A 2009 Science study on cerebral adrenoleukodystrophy and 2010 Nature publication on β-thalassemia reported early clinical milestones for lentiviral gene-addition approaches.

bluebird bio (2010-2025)

In September 2010, the company changed its name to bluebird bio and completed a $35 million Series B financing round in March of that year. As bluebird bio, the company advanced programs in β-thalassemia, cerebral adrenoleukodystrophy, and sickle cell disease through clinical development. Three years later, the company went public, completing its initial public offering on the NASDAQ in June of 2013.

Clinical results from the company's programs were published in peer-reviewed journals in 2018, 2022, and 2024. Studies reported outcomes in patients with transfusion-dependent β-thalassemia, sickle cell disease, and cerebral adrenoleukodystrophy, reflecting the expansion of the company's lentiviral gene-addition platform across multiple rare diseases.

Between 2022 and 2023, the FDA approved three products developed by the company: Zynteglo for pediatric and adult patients with β-thalassemia requiring regular red blood cell transfusions, Skysona for boys aged 4 through 17 with early, active cerebral adrenoleukodystrophy, and Lyfgenia for patients aged 12 years and older with sickle cell disease and a history of vaso-occlusive events.

Genetix Biotherapeutics (2025-present)

As of January 2025, the company numbered 248 employees. In February 2025, bluebird bio announced a definitive agreement to be acquired by investment funds managed by The Carlyle Group and SK Capital Partners. The acquisition closed in June 2025, taking the company private and bringing in a new executive management team led by CEO David Meek.

In September 2025, the company rebranded as Genetix Biotherapeutics Inc., adopting a modified version of its original Genetix name. Following the rebrand, the company stated that its priorities included commercial execution, expanding access to its approved therapies, increasing manufacturing capacity, and improving the treatment experience for patients and providers.

== Products ==
- Lyfgenia (lovotibeglogene autotemcel): An autologous hematopoietic stem cell-based gene therapy indicated in the United States for patients aged 12 years or older with sickle cell disease and a history of vaso-occlusive events. With pivotal data showing that most evaluable treated patients experienced complete resolution of vaso-occlusive events between six and eighteen months after infusion, the FDA approved Lyfgenia in December 2023, the same day it announced approval of the first gene therapies for sickle cell disease, including Lyfgenia and Casgevy. Lyfgenia carries a boxed warning for hematologic malignancy.
- Zynteglo (betibeglogene autotemcel): An autologous hematopoietic stem cell-based gene therapy indicated in the United States for adult and pediatric patients with β-thalassemia who require regular red blood cell transfusions. In clinical studies reviewed by the FDA, most patients treated with betibeglogene autotemcel achieved transfusion independence. The FDA approved Zynteglo in August 2022. Long-term follow-up data for betibeglogene autotemcel have been reported for up to 10 years in published studies.
- Skysona (elivaldogene autotemcel): An autologous hematopoietic stem cell-based gene therapy indicated in the United States to slow the progression of neurologic dysfunction in boys aged 4 through 17 years with early, active cerebral adrenoleukodystrophy who do not have an HLA-matched donor for hematopoietic stem cell transplant. The FDA granted accelerated approval in September 2022. Skysona carries a boxed warning for hematologic malignancy, and the FDA required updated safety labeling in 2025.

== See also ==
- Gene therapy
- Lentiviral vector
- Sickle cell disease
- Beta thalassemia
- Cerebral adrenoleukodystrophy
