= Lifileucel =

Medication

Clinical data
- Trade names: Amtagvi
- Other names: LN-144
- AHFS/Drugs.com: Monograph
- MedlinePlus: a624019
- License data: US DailyMed: Lifileucel
- Routes of administration: Intravenous
- Drug class: Antineoplastic
- ATC code: L01XL11 (WHO)

Legal status
- Legal status: CA: ℞-only / Schedule D; US: ℞-only

Identifiers
- CAS Number: 2306267-74-1
- DrugBank: DB17107
- UNII: R0835E18NH
- KEGG: D12833

Lifileucel, sold under the brand name Amtagvi, is an adoptive T cell therapy used for the treatment of melanoma.

Specifically, lifileucel is a tumor-derived T cell immunotherapy composed of a recipient's own T cells (autologous). A portion of the recipient's tumor tissue is removed during a surgical procedure prior to treatment. The recipient's T cells (the tumor-infiltrating lymphocytes) are separated from the tumor tissue, multiplied and then infused into the recipient in a single dose. T cells are a type of cell that helps the immune system fight cancer and infections.

The most common adverse reactions include chills, fever, fatigue, tachycardia (abnormally fast heart rate), diarrhea, febrile neutropenia (fever associated with a low level of certain white blood cells), edema (swelling due to buildup of fluid in body tissues), rash, hypotension, hair loss, infection, hypoxia (abnormally low oxygen levels in the body) and shortness of breath.

Lifileucel is the first tumor-derived T cell immunotherapy approved by the US Food and Drug Administration. It was approved for medical use in the United States in February 2024.

== Medical uses ==
Lifileucel is indicated for the treatment of adults with unresectable (unable to be removed with surgery) or metastatic (spread to other parts of the body) melanoma previously treated with a PD-1 blocking antibody, and if BRAF V600 mutation positive, a BRAF inhibitor with or without a MEK inhibitor.

== Side effects ==
The most common adverse reactions include chills, fever, fatigue, tachycardia (abnormally fast heart rate), diarrhea, febrile neutropenia (fever associated with a low level of certain white blood cells), edema (swelling due to buildup of fluid in body tissues), rash, hypotension, hair loss, infection, hypoxia (abnormally low oxygen levels in the body) and feeling short of breath.

People treated with lifileucel may exhibit prolonged severe low blood count, severe infection, cardiac disorder, or develop worsened respiratory or renal function or have fatal treatment-related complications. A boxed warning is included in the prescribing informationl containing information about these risks.

== History ==
The safety and effectiveness of lifileucel was evaluated in a global, multi-center, multi-cohort, clinical study including adult participants with unresectable or metastatic melanoma who had previously been treated with at least one systemic therapy, including a PD-1 blocking antibody, and if positive for the BRAF V600 mutation, a BRAF inhibitor or BRAF inhibitor with an MEK inhibitor. Effectiveness was measured via the objective response rate to treatment and duration of response (measured from the date of confirmed initial objective response to the date of progression, death from any cause, starting a new anti-cancer treatment or discontinuation from follow-up, whichever came first).

The US Food and Drug Administration (FDA) approved Lifileucel through the accelerated approval pathway and granted the application orphan drug, regenerative medicine advanced therapy, fast track, and priority review designations under the brand name Amtagvi to Iovance Biotherapeutics.

== Society and culture ==
=== Legal status ===
Lifileucel was approved for medical use in the United States in February 2024.

=== Names ===
Lifileucel is the international nonproprietary name.

Lifileucel is sold under the brand name Amtagvi.

== Research ==
The clinical trials for lifileucel in melanoma include two phases. Phase II (178 participants) demonstrated the therapy's efficacy and durable response in participants with unresectable or metastatic melanoma who had failed PD-1 blockers and BRAF inhibitors. However, adverse effects were statistically significant. Phase III (670 participants) aims to compare lifileucel combined with pembrolizumab for advanced melanoma stages (IIIC, IIID, or IV). Results are expected by 2028 and full completion by 2030.
