= Retinal gene therapy using lentiviral vectors =

Experimental gene therapy

Gene therapy using lentiviral vectors was being explored in early stage trials as of 2009.

== Trials ==
In a Phase I clinical trial of three patients, two showed no improvement and one of them had some improvements. The study concluded further investigation is warranted for the use of the procedure to treat Leber's congenital amaurosis. Other early trials have been used to explore the treatments potential, including for therapeutic use of recombinant adeno-associated virus (rAAV) vectors. Many other possible viral vectors remain options for the treatment of various genetic disorders in the retina that lead to blindness. Retinal gene therapy using lentivirus vectors may be a way to treat a wider range of genetic disorders in the retina because of the various properties of the lentivirus that make it an attractive alternative to rAAV vectors.

Like rAAV vectors, lentiviral vectors offer many features that make it an excellent tool for molecular biology and possible medical treatments. Like many other vectors commonly used in the laboratory, lentiviral vectors allow for efficient transfer of foreign DNA (transgene) to target cells, long-lasting and stable expression of the foreign DNA, and a generally reduced ability to produce an immune response. Like many other retroviral vectors, lentiviral vectors do not possess any of their original DNA content, allowing as little provocation of the immune response as possible. Unlike many retroviral vectors, though, lentiviral vectors offer the advantage of being able to successfully introduce a transgene to target cells whether or not the target cells proliferate (many retroviral vectors require replicating DNA to insert themselves into the host genome).

An important consideration for the application of the lentiviral vector is the parent virus that gave rise to the vector. Not all lentiviral vectors are perfectly suited to every application, and sometimes it becomes necessary for the researcher to try work with a different lentiviral vector if one does not offer the desired transgene expression. Other times, it may be necessary to use another viral vector altogether. There are options to choose from between lentiviral vectors, though, and many popular lentiviral vectors have either a human immunodeficiency virus 1 (HIV-1) or equine infectious anemia virus (EIAV).

== Advantages ==
Although both the lentiviral and rAAV vectors provide a high efficiency of gene transfer to cells in vivo, rAAV vectors do have some slight disadvantages that would preclude their use for certain diseases. rAAV vectors, for example, only allow genes less than 4 kb (4000 bases) for insertion into the vector; many genetic diseases, not only those the retina, have genes larger than 4 kb in length and thus does not allow the use of rAAV vectors. One such disease, Stargardt's disease (OMIM #601691), can involve a mutation in the ATP-binding cassette transporter 4 (ABCA4) gene. This gene contains 50 exons with a coding region spanning 6.7 kb and thus requires a viral vector capable of handling such a relatively large insert. Lentiviral vectors, unlike rAAV vectors, are capable of efficiently incorporating and allowing expression of transgene fragments as large as 10 kb, and previous work suggests the lentiviral vector is a possible therapeutic option for patients with Stargardt's disease (see below). This is not to suggest lentiviral vectors do not efficiently transduce cells in vivo as well as rAAV vectors with transcripts less than 4 kb, though. Results of lentiviral gene transfer in mice for LCA-2 indicate gene therapy using lentiviral vectors is just as effective as using rAAV; the decision to use a lentiviral vector versus an rAAV vector may simply be a matter of preference.

== Disadvantages ==
All transgene vectors have the risk of causing moderate to severe side effects with respect to the immune system, and lentiviral vectors are no exception. In the laboratory or clinical trials, one indication of an immune reaction to the vector is a drop in transgene expression. Often, this sudden loss of transgene expression is not due to a simple silencing of a transgene or loss of the vector from the cell, but loss of the cell itself. The body has multiple methods of targeting and ridding itself of any cells infected with the lentivirus, all of them falling under either activity by the innate immune system or adaptive immune system. In the cases of some HIV-1-derived lentiviral vectors, both immune responses can occur.

In an innate immune response, toll-like receptors (TLRs) found in many cells recognize particles and molecules normally produced by retroviruses like genomic DNA typically found in viruses, genomic RNA found in retroviruses, or double-stranded RNA found in still other retroviruses. These TLRs can initiate downstream effects that can eventually result in the loss of the infected cell and complications in the treated patient. Other work by researchers suggests interferon may play an important role in preventing successful infection of the target cell. Although some researchers suggest treating interferon receptors in the patient with immunosuppressive drugs to allow for a greater response to lentiviral vector treatment, there is still very little data to suggest this approach would work or not.

Expression of the transgene itself may cause an adaptive immune response in addition to any innate immune response initiated by the lentivirus. Because the transgene itself produces a protein either not produced by the cell normally or produces a protein in such a great quantity as compared to normal, the body may form antibodies specific to the transgene, producing further problems. Although these immune system responses may present hurdles to future medical treatments, researchers may manage the issue with different methods.

== Future treatments of genetic disorders ==
Lentiviral vectors may offer substantial promise for the treatment of many genetic disorders manifesting themselves in the retina, such as LCA-2 and Stargardt disease.

LCA-2, for example, involves a loss of function in both copies of a gene known as RPE65. In a normal, healthy retina, this protein acts as an isomerase, converting all-trans-retinol to 11-cis-retinol in the visual cycle. Loss of this protein results in an early-onset retinal degeneration in which affected patients become blind. Swiss researchers used a lentiviral vector containing a copy of the human RPE65 gene under control of an 800 bp fragment of the human promoter to maintain cone and visual function to mice. Although there appears to be a relatively narrow treatment window (after birth but before the retinal degeneration becomes too severe), mice showed expression and cone function four months after treatment. While addition of a functional RPE65 protein to cones helps slow the rate of visual loss but cannot halt or reverse the damage, treatment in humans may help prolong functional vision to patients with this disease.

Stargardt disease patients may also one day benefit from lentiviral gene therapy. Unlike rAAV vectors which can only carry relatively small genes, lentiviral vectors can carry larger genes, making them the vector of choice for possible therapy with a functional copy of the ABCA4 gene which is not functional in Stargardt disease patients. Two copies of a nonfunctional ABCA4 gene result in a buildup of a retinoid compound known as A2E, which is believed to act like a detergent inside cells, causing massive cellular damage. As A2E buildup from the photoreceptor cells collects in the retinal pigment epithelium, severe visual loss occurs. When researchers treated Stargardt disease-affected mice with a lentiviral vector containing a functional ABCA4 gene, A2E buildup in the retinal pigment epithelium decreased. More importantly, mice regained some loss of vision. Future lentiviral vector treatments in humans may help preserve vision in these patients.

== See also ==
- Lentiviral vector in gene therapy
