= Iovance Biotherapeutics =

American biopharmaceutical startup

Iovance Biotherapeutics, Inc.
- Formerly: Lion Biotechnologies, Inc.
- Type: Public
- Traded as: Nasdaq: IOVA; Russell 2000 component
- Industry: Biotechnology; Pharmaceutical; Cancer immunotherapy
- Founded: 2007; 19 years ago
- Headquarters: San Carlos, California, U.S.
- Key people: Steven Rosenberg Interim CEO: Frederick G. Vogt
- Revenue: ▲US$264 million (2025)
- Net income: ▼ −US$391 million (2025)
- Number of employees: 319 (December 31, 2021)
- Website: iovance.com

Iovance Biotherapeutics, Inc. is a biopharmaceutical company based in Philadelphia, Pennsylvania. The company works to develop tumor-infiltrating lymphocyte (TIL) therapies against cancer.

== History ==
The company was founded in 2007 as Genesis Biopharma. In 2013, Lion merged with Genesis Biopharma аnd became Lion Bio Pharma, which was then rebranded to Iovance in 2017.

In 2024, the US FDA gave accelerated approval to Lifileucel, marketed under the brand name Amtagvi, the company's tumor-infiltrating lymphocyte drug for the treatment of unresectable or metastatic melanoma.

== See also ==
- Kite Pharma
