= Betibeglogene autotemcel =

Gene therapy

Clinical data
- Trade names: Zynteglo
- Other names: LentiGlobin BB305, autologous CD34+ cells encoding βA-T87Q-globin gene
- AHFS/Drugs.com: Monograph
- MedlinePlus: a622065
- License data: EU EMA: by INN; US DailyMed: Betibeglogene autotemcel
- Pregnancy category: Contraindicated
- Routes of administration: Intravenous
- ATC code: B06AX02 (WHO)

Legal status
- Legal status: UK: POM (Prescription only); US: ℞-only; EU: Rx-only; In general: ℞ (Prescription only)

Identifiers
- DrugBank: DB16900
- UNII: MEE8487RTP
- KEGG: D11930

Betibeglogene autotemcel, sold under the brand name Zynteglo, is a gene therapy for the treatment for beta thalassemia. It was developed by Bluebird Bio and was given breakthrough therapy designation by the US Food and Drug Administration in February 2015.

The most common adverse reactions include reduced platelet and other blood cell levels, as well as mucositis, febrile neutropenia, vomiting, pyrexia (fever), alopecia (hair loss), epistaxis (nosebleed), abdominal pain, musculoskeletal pain, cough, headache, diarrhea, rash, constipation, nausea, decreased appetite, pigmentation disorder and pruritus (itch).

It was approved for medical use in the European Union in May 2019, and in the United States in August 2022.

== Medical uses ==
Betibeglogene autotemcel is indicated for the treatment of people twelve years and older with transfusion-dependent beta thalassemia who do not have a β0/β0 genotype, for whom hematopoietic stem cell (HSC) transplantation is appropriate but a human leukocyte antigen (HLA)-matched related HSC donor is not available.

Betibeglogene autotemcel is made individually for each recipient out of stem cells collected from their blood, and must only be given to the recipient for whom it is made. It is given as an autologous intravenous infusion and the dose depends on the recipient's body weight.

Before betibeglogene autotemcel is given, the recipient receives conditioning chemotherapy to clear their bone marrow of cells (myeloablation).

To make betibeglogene autotemcel, the stem cells taken from the recipient's blood are modified by a virus that carries working copies of the beta globin gene into the cells. When these modified cells are given back to the recipient, they are transported in the bloodstream to the bone marrow where they start to make healthy red blood cells that produce beta globin. The effects of betibeglogene autotemcel are expected to last for the recipient's lifetime.

== Mechanism of action ==
Beta thalassemia is caused by mutations to or deletions of the HBB gene leading to reduced or absent synthesis of the beta chains of hemoglobin that result in variable outcomes ranging from severe anemia to clinically asymptomatic individuals. LentiGlobin BB305 is a lentiviral vector which inserts a functioning version of the HBB gene into a recipient's blood-producing hematopoietic stem cells (HSC) ex vivo. The resulting engineered HSCs are then reintroduced to the recipient.

== History ==
In early clinical trials several participants with beta thalassemia, who usually require frequent blood transfusions to treat their disease, were able to forgo blood transfusions for extended periods of time. In 2018, results from phase 1-2 trials suggested that of 22 participants receiving Lentiglobin gene therapy, 15 were able to stop or reduce regular blood transfusions.

In February 2021, a clinical trial of betibeglogene autotemcel in sickle cell anemia was suspended following an unexpected instance of acute myeloid leukemia. The HGB-206 Phase 1/2 study is expected to conclude in March 2023.

It was designated an orphan drug by the European Medicines Agency (EMA) and by the US Food and Drug Administration (FDA) in 2013. The Food and Drug Administration has also declared betibeglogene autotemcel a Regenerative Medicine Advanced Therapy.

The safety and effectiveness of betibeglogene autotemcel were established in two multicenter clinical studies that included adult and pediatric participants with beta-thalassemia requiring regular transfusions. Effectiveness was established based on achievement of transfusion independence, which is attained when the participant maintains a predetermined level of hemoglobin without needing any red blood cell transfusions for at least 12 months. Of 41 participants receiving betibeglogene autotemcel, 89% achieved transfusion independence.

== Society and culture ==
=== Legal status ===
It was approved for medical use in the European Union in May 2019, and in the United States in August 2022. On 24 March 2022, the European Commission withdrew the marketing authorisation for Zynteglo at the request of bluebird bio (Netherlands) B.V, for commercial reasons.

=== Economics ===
Bluebird bio charges $2.8 million in the United States for a treatment of Zynteglo.

=== Names ===
The international nonproprietary name (INN) is betibeglogene autotemcel.
