= Infusion therapy =

Medical aspects of fluid and medication infusion by therapeutic application

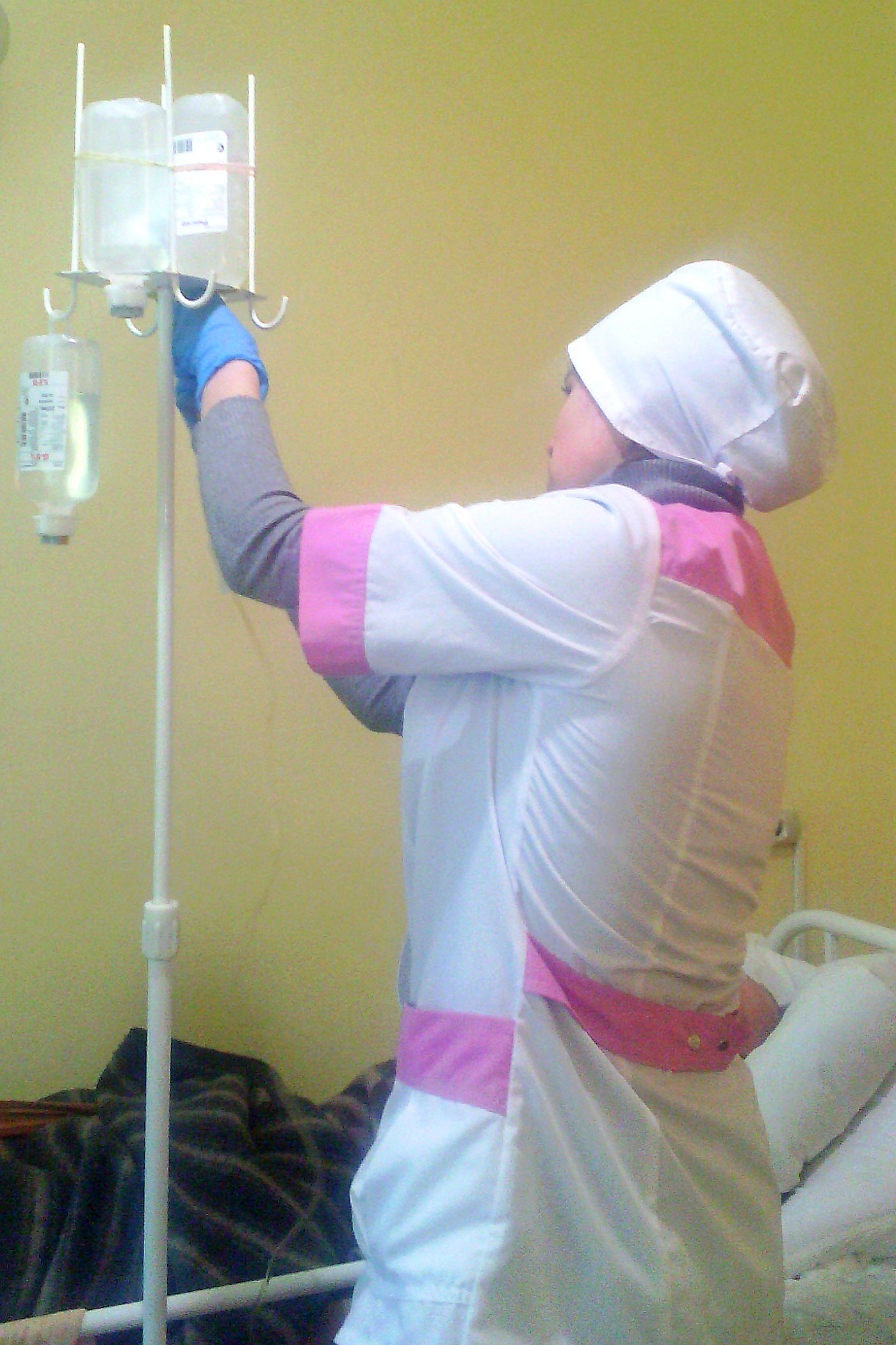
Nurse preparing an infusion

In medicine, infusion therapy deals with all aspects of fluid and medication infusion, via intravenous or subcutaneous application. A special infusion pump can be used for this purpose.

A fenestrated catheter is frequently inserted into the localized area to be treated.

There are a range of delivery methods for infusion of drugs via catheter:

- Electronic Pump: Drugs are often pre-mixed from vials and stored in infusion bags to be delivered by electronic pump.
- Elastomeric pump
- Pre-Filled Infusion Therapy: with this latest technology, a unit dose can be metered to the location from a pre-filled container.

Infusion therapy has a range of medical applications including sedation, anesthesia, post-operative analgesic pain management, chemotherapy, and treatment of infectious diseases

Advantages of infusion therapy over other non-site-specific delivery methodologies are primarily efficacy through precision of medication delivery.

New standards for infusible pharmaceuticals have been achieved in recent years with the advent of pre-filled, ready-to-use, dose-specific products. Advanced aseptic presentation, with hermetically sealed containers, allows predictable sterility, ease of use, improved control, and lower total costs. Essentially, systematizing the delivery mechanism and standardizing the delivery container.

== Treatments ==
Infusion therapy involves the administration of medication through a needle or catheter. Typically, "infusion therapy" means that a drug is administered intravenously or subcutaneously. The term may pertain where drugs are provided through other non-oral routes of administration, such as intramuscular injection and epidural administration (into the membranes surrounding the spinal cord).

Until the 1980s, patients receiving infusion therapy often had to remain in an inpatient setting for the duration of their therapy. New technologies and heightened emphasis on cost containment in health care, as well as developments in the clinical administration of the therapy, led to strategies to administer infusion therapy in alternate settings (at clinics and at home) in an effort to reduce hospital readmissions.

== See also ==
- Intravenous therapy
