= Saudi Food and Drug Authority =

Saudi Arabian organisation

Saudi Food and Drug Authority الهيئة العامة للغذاء والدواء
- Formation: 29 August 2003; 23 years ago
- Type: Authority
- Location: Riyadh, Saudi Arabia
- Region served: Saudi Arabia
- Chairman: Abdurrahman Al-Jalajel
- CEO: Hisham Aljadhey
- Website: Official Website (English)

Saudi Food and Drug Authority (SFDA) (Arabic: الهيئة العامة للغذاء والدواء) is an independent body for the Kingdom of Saudi Arabia that aims to ensure food and drug safety for the nation.

The Authority was founded in August 29, 2003. The Saudi Ministry of Health has given it responsibility for the regulation of pharmaceuticals, and it is an influential organization among states within the region.

== Work in English-language publications ==
In 2016, members of the Authority and others published a study that compared the Authority with the best practices of comparable ones in Australia, Singapore, and Canada.

== International Agreements ==
The Food and Drug Administration has an agreement with the SFDA.

== International Cooperation ==
in August 2025, the Authority organized the "Hack4SaferPLATES" Hackathon in Riyadh, in collaborration with the Food and Agriculture Organization (FAO), with the aim of developing innovative technological solutions to enhance food safety and improve food control systems. The event brought together specialists, developers, and entrepreneurs from across the region.
