= Nicole Capitaine =

French astronomer

- Born: 14 March 1948 (age 78); Neuilly-sur-Seine, France
- Citizenship: French
- Education: Pierre and Marie Curie University
- Known for: International expert in astrometry and associated standards
- Awards: Descartes Prize, Struve Medal
- Scientific career
- Fields: Astronomy
- Workplaces: Paris Observatory

Nicole Capitaine (born Nicole Taton; 14 March 1948) is an astronomer at the Paris Observatory who is known as an expert on astrometry and related standards.

== Early life and education ==
In 1969, Capitaine received a bachelor's degree ("licence") from the Faculty of Sciences in Paris in mathematics. (She was thus one of the last graduates of this subdivision of the university before its re-organization in the wake of the Paris disturbances of 1968.) In 1970 she graduated with a degree in astronomy from Pierre and Marie Curie University. The same year she joined the Paris Observatory as an assistant. She then held several positions there before becoming an astronomer in charge of research. In 1972, she received a PhD in astronomy at the Pierre and Marie Curie University. In 1982, she wrote her habilitation thesis, giving her the status of direct researcher.

== Research career ==
Capitaine became deputy director of the Department of Fundamental Astronomy at the Paris Observatory in 1985. She became the director in 1993. Her scientific activity was carried out mainly within the framework of the Space Geodesy Research Group (GRGS), as well as various working groups of the International Astronomical Union. In 2002, still at the Paris Observatory, she became a full-time astronomer in the SYRTE department (Space Time Reference Systems). From 2003 to 2007, she served as a member of the Standing Committee for Science and Metrology co-chaired by Christian Bordé and Jean Kovalevsky. In 2013, she retired and became an emeritus astronomer.

Her work, carried out in the framework of a large international cooperation, led to a better definition of reference systems and time scales for astronomy, as well as to a better knowledge of the rotation of the Earth. They have also led to the adoption by the IAU and IUGG (International Geodesic and Geophysical Union) of new parameters and models for astronomy and geodesy, which are essential for many applications to space dynamics and the dynamics of the Solar System.

=== Awards and honors ===
- Antoine d'Abbadie Prize from the French Academy of Sciences / Prix Antoine d'Abbadie de l'Académie des sciences (1986)
- Member of the Bureau des Longitudes / Membre du Bureau des Longitudes (1992)
- Descartes Prize of the European Union / Prix Descartes de l'Union européenne (2003)
- Chevalier des palmes académiques
- Officier de la Légion d’Honneur
