= Elastomeric pump =

Medical pump for administering liquid drugs

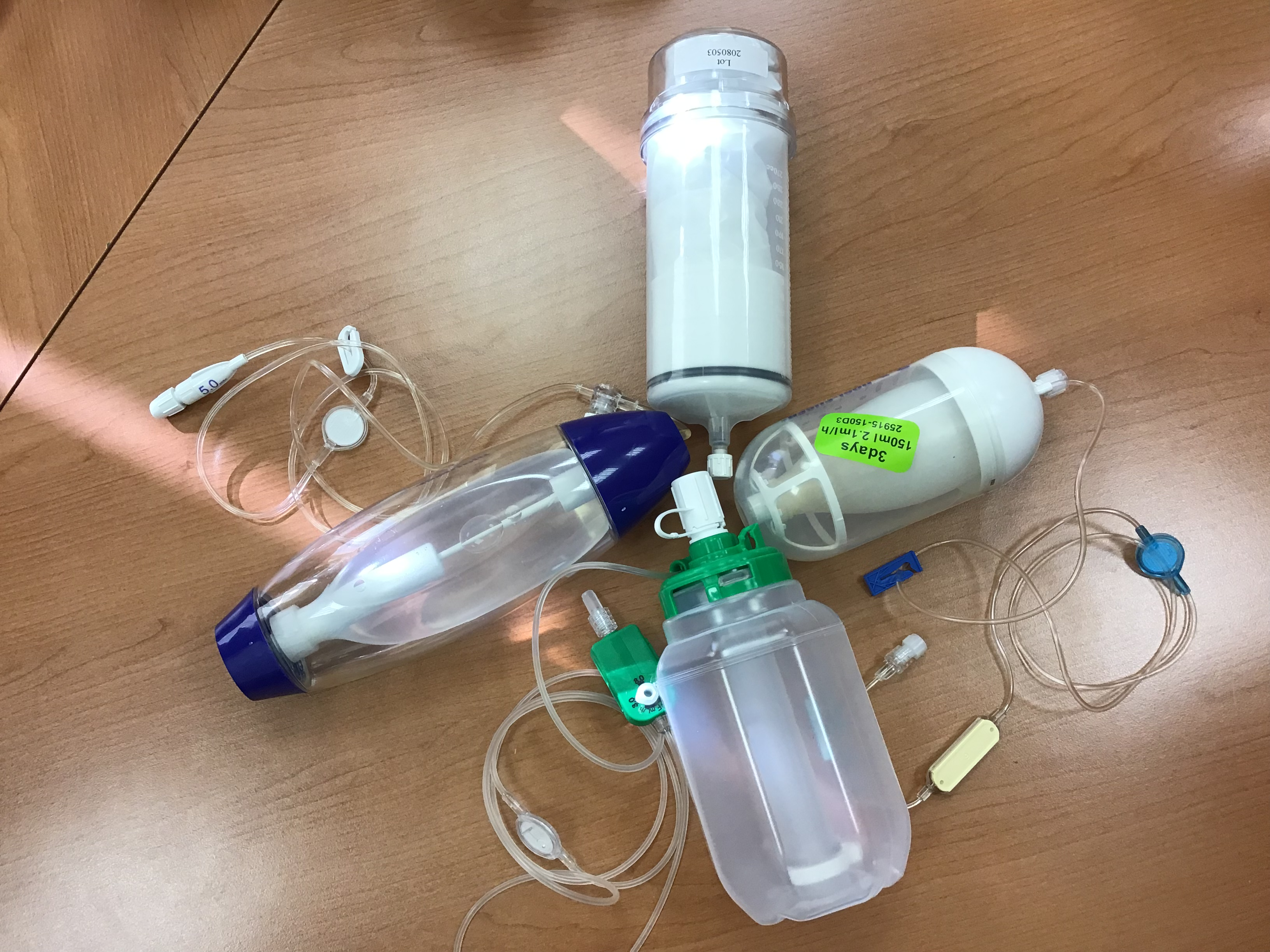
Different models of elastomeric pumps

Elastomeric pumps, also called balloon pumps or ball pumps, are usually used in the medical field to administer liquid drugs such as local anesthetics, analgesics, cytostatics or antibiotics (depending on the therapy).

The required pressure for administering the drug comes from the elastomeric layer that is molded inside the pump. When the pump is filled, the layer is stretched. The elastic constriction drives the liquid through the tubing and eventually through a flow restrictor out into the patient connection. The pressure is consistent until near the end of the infusion, when there will usually be a pressure spike resulting in a higher flow rate. The accuracy of the flow rate is controlled by a flow restrictor (glass capillary or steel cannula) that is molded into the tubing of the system or placed within the elastomeric reservoir. Elastomeric pumps do not require any electricity and are not gravity-driven. When placed above or below the patient, the flow rate is typically increased or decreased slightly (head height effect). Filling the pump is done manually through a one-way valve using a syringe or peristaltic repeater pump. Elastomeric pumps are maintenance-free, run independently without any electronics, and are single-use disposable.

Depending on the pump's size the drug inside the pump can be delivered over a time spread varying between thirty minutes to seven days.

This type of pump is ideal for outpatients or patients that require a high level of mobility.

Elastomeric devices have found particular use in paediatric outpatients, where longer courses of antibiotics can be administered to the children out of hospital (outpatient administration of antibiotics - OPAT).

These pumps are guided by ISO 28620:2020.

== See also ==
- Infusion pump
- Syringe pump
- Outpatient parenteral antibiotic therapy (OPAT)
