= Outpatient parenteral antibiotic therapy =

- Other names: OPAT

== Clinical practice ==
Outpatient parenteral antibiotic therapy (OPAT) is used to administer non-oral antibiotics (usually intravenously) without the need for ongoing hospitalisation. OPAT is particularly useful for people who are not severely ill but do require a prolonged course of treatment that cannot be given in oral form. OPAT is being increasingly adopted as part of antimicrobial stewardship programs; it can reduce length of stay, costs and adverse events while improving quality of life. In a six-year real-world retrospective study conducted at an Italian tertiary-care center, OPAT allowed a relative cost reduction of about 92% and an average daily cost of €32 for OPAT versus €400 for inpatient therapy. OPAT can be administered in an outpatient facility (including a provider's office, infusion center or day hospital) or at a patient's residence using an infusion pump, such as an elastomeric pump.

=== Subcutaneous antibiotic therapy ===
Although OPAT is traditionally based on intravenous administration, the subcutaneous route has emerged as a pragmatic alternative in selected clinical settings. Several antibiotics, including β-lactams (most commonly ceftriaxone) and glycopeptides (teicoplanin), are administered subcutaneously (off-label) in outpatient and home-care contexts. Available clinical and pharmacokinetic data suggest that subcutaneous administration may achieve adequate drug exposure and clinical effectiveness when appropriate dosing and loading strategies are applied.

== Common antimicrobials ==
Common antimicrobials used for continuous infusion are shown below:

Antibiotic	Stability at 25 °C	Diluent	Existing data in elastomeric pumps
cefepime	24 hours	normal saline	Yes
ceftazidime	48 hours	normal saline	Yes
clindamycin	16 days	dextrose 5%	No
flucloxacillin	24 hours	normal saline	Yes
fosfomycin	24 hours	water for injection	No
oxacillin	24 hours	normal saline	No
benzylpenicillin potassium	24–48 hours	ringer acetate	Yes
benzylpenicillin sodium	12–24 hours	normal saline	Yes
piperacillin/tazobactam	24 hours	normal saline	Yes
vancomycin	7 days	normal saline	Yes

Before starting beta-lactams and vancomycin infusion, it is advisable to administer a loading dose in order to reduce time to reach target concentrations
