= Fortress Biotech =

Fortress Biotech Inc.
- Type: Public
- Traded as: Nasdaq: FBIO; Russell 2000 Index component
- Industry: Biopharmaceuticals
- Founded: 2006
- Founder: Dr. Lindsay Allan Rosenwald
- Headquarters: Bay Harbor Islands, Florida
- Key people: Lindsay A. Rosenwald, M.D.(Chairman/ President/CEO); Michael S. Weiss (Executive Vice Chairman); Eric K. Rowinsky, M.D. (Co-Vice Chairman); Jimmie Harvey, Jr., M.D. (Director)
- Website: www.fortressbiotech.com

Fortress Biotech Inc., commonly known as Fortress Bio, is a biopharmaceutical company that acquires, develops, and commercializes innovative pharmaceutical and biotechnology products. Led by CEO Lindsay A. Rosenwald, M.D., Fortress and most of its subsidiary companies are headquartered in Bay Harbor Islands, Florida.

== History ==
The company was founded in 2006 under the name Coronado Biosciences, initially as an oncology company. In 2011, it was announced that Coronado raised $47.4 million in funding. Shortly thereafter it became a public company by registering all of its private shares as common stock. The company changed its name to Fortress Biotech in April 2015.

In November 2019, Fortress Biotech was ranked number 10 in the 2019 Deloitte Technology Fast 500 annual rankings.

== Subsidiaries ==
Fortress Bio has 10 biopharmaceutical subsidiary companies which cover a range of medical therapy areas, including potential cancer treatments and therapies for rare diseases and conditions. These subsidiaries include Aevitas Therapeutics (formed in 2017), Avenue Therapeutics (formed in 2015), Caelum Biosciences (formed in 2017), Cellvation (formed in 2016), Checkpoint Therapeutics (formed in 2015), Cyprium Therapeutics (formed in 2017), Helocyte (formed in 2015), Journey Medical Corporation (formed in 2014), Mustang Bio (formed in 2015), Tamid Bio (formed in 2017) and Baergic Bio (formed in 2019).

== Products ==
Fortress Bio’s marketed products are developed and commercialized by its subsidiary Journey Medical Corporation. These include Targadox tablets indicated for acne, eczema emollient Ceracade, wound cream Luxamend, topical corticosteroid Triderm, topical broad-spectrum antifungal solution Exelderm, Ala-Quin topical cream for skin conditions, and Ala-Scalp hydrocortisone lotion for skin conditions.
