= New Drug Application =

Request to the US FDA to approve a new drug

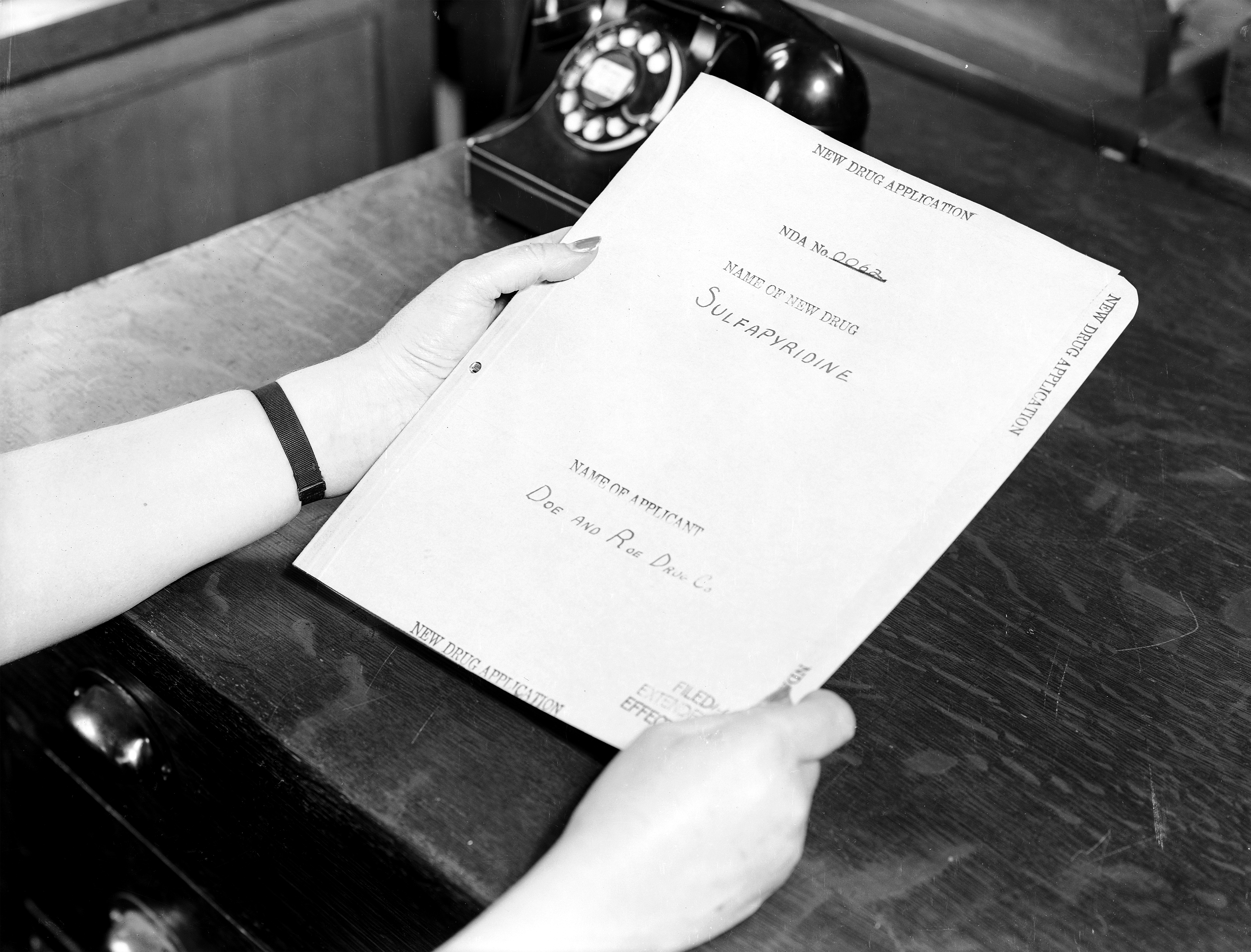
A new drug application in the 1930s for sulfapyridine to the United States Food and Drug Administration

The Food and Drug Administration's (FDA) New Drug Application (NDA) is the vehicle in the United States through which drug sponsors formally propose that the FDA approve a new pharmaceutical for sale and marketing. Some 30% or less of initial drug candidates proceed through the entire multi-year process of drug development, concluding with an approved NDA, if successful.

The goals of the NDA are to provide enough information to permit FDA reviewers to establish the complete history of the candidate drug. Among facts needed for the application are:

- Patent and manufacturing information
- Drug safety and specific effectiveness for its proposed use(s) when used as directed
- Reports on the design, compliance, and conclusions of completed clinical trials by the Institutional Review Board
- Drug susceptibility to abuse
- Proposed labeling (package insert) and directions for use

Exceptions to this process include voter driven initiatives for medical marijuana in certain states.

== Before trials ==
To legally test the drug on human subjects in the United States, the maker must first obtain an Investigational New Drug (IND) designation from FDA. This application is based on nonclinical data, typically from a combination of in vivo and in vitro laboratory safety studies, that shows the drug is safe enough to test in humans. Often the "new" drugs that are submitted for approval include new molecular entities or old medications that have been chemically modified to elicit differential pharmacological effects or reduced side effects.

== Clinical trials ==
Since the 1962 Kefauver–Harris Amendment, new drugs are statutorily required to demonstrate both safety and effectiveness through substantial evidence for approval. The amendment defines substantial evidence as "evidence consisting of adequate and well-controlled investigations, including clinical investigations, by experts qualified by scientific training and experience to evaluate the effectiveness of the drug involved, on the basis of which it could fairly and responsibly be concluded by such experts that the drug will have the effect it purports or is represented to have under the conditions of use prescribed, recommended, or suggested in the labeling or proposed labeling thereof." This standard lies at the heart of the regulatory program for drugs. Data for the submission must include those from one or more rigorous clinical trials.

Due to the plural "adequate and well-controlled investigations" in the statute, FDA has interpreted the substantial evidence requirement as requiring at least two adequate and well-controlled clinical trials, each convincing on its own. However, in 1997, Congress passed an amendment, expressly granting FDA authority to consider other types of confirmatory evidence along with one adequate and well-controlled clinical investigation for approval.

The trials are typically conducted in three phases:

- Phase 1: The drug is tested in 20 to 100 healthy volunteers to determine its safety at low doses. About 70% of candidate drugs advance to Phase 2.
- Phase 2: The drug is tested for both efficacy and safety in up to several hundred people with the targeted disease. Some two-thirds of candidate drugs fail in Phase 2 clinical trials due to the drug not being as effective as anticipated.
- Phase 3: The drug is typically tested in several hundred to several thousand people with the targeted disease in double-blind, placebo controlled trials to demonstrate its specific efficacy. Under 30% of drug candidates succeed through Phase 3.
- Phase 4: These are postmarketing surveillance trials in several thousand people taking the drug for its intended purpose to monitor efficacy and safety of the approved marketed drug.

The legal requirements for safety and effectiveness have been interpreted as requiring scientific evidence that the benefits of a drug outweigh the risks and that adequate instructions exist for use, since many drugs have adverse side effects.

== The actual application ==
The results of the testing program are codified in an FDA-approved public document that is called the product label, package insert or Full Prescribing Information.The prescribing information is widely available on the web from the FDA, drug manufacturers, and frequently inserted into drug packages. The main purpose of a drug label is to provide healthcare providers and consumers with adequate information and directions for the safe use of the drug.

The documentation required in an NDA is supposed to tell "the drug’s whole story, including what happened during the clinical tests, what the ingredients of the drug are, the results of the animal studies, how the drug behaves in the body, and how it is manufactured, processed and packaged.” Once approval of an NDA is obtained, the new drug can be legally marketed starting that day in the United States.

Once the application is submitted, the FDA has 60 days to conduct a preliminary review, which assesses whether the NDA is "sufficiently complete to permit a substantive review." If the FDA finds the NDA insufficiently complete, then the FDA rejects the application by sending the applicant a Refuse to File letter, which explains where the application failed to meet requirements. Where the application cannot be granted for substantive reasons, the FDA issues a Complete Response Letter.

Assuming the FDA finds the NDA acceptable, a 74-day letter is published. A standard review implies an FDA decision within about 10 months while a priority review should complete within 6 months.

== Requirements for similar products ==
Biologics, such as vaccines and many recombinant proteins used in medical treatments are generally approved by FDA via a Biologic License Application (BLA), rather than an NDA. The manufacture of biologics is considered to differ fundamentally from that of less complex chemicals, requiring a somewhat different approval process.

Generic drugs that have already been approved via an NDA submitted by another maker are approved via an Abbreviated New Drug Application (ANDA), which does not require all of the clinical trials normally required for a new drug in an NDA. Most biological drugs, including a majority of recombinant proteins are considered ineligible for an ANDA under current US law. However, a handful of biologic medicines, including biosynthetic insulin, growth hormone, glucagon, calcitonin, and hyaluronidase are grandfathered under governance of the Federal Food Drug and Cosmetics Act, because these products were already approved when legislation to regulate biotechnology medicines later passed as part of the Public Health Services Act.

Medications intended for use in animals are submitted to a different center within FDA, the Center for Veterinary Medicine (CVM) in a New Animal Drug Application (NADA). These are also specifically evaluated for their use in food animals and their possible effect on the food from animals treated with the drug.

== See also ==
- Drug development
- Inverse benefit law
- Investigational New Drug, FDA application to start clinical trials
- Kefauver Harris Amendment, a 1962 amendment to the Federal Food, Drug, and Cosmetic Act (e.g. to also require evidence of efficacy)
- Lists of investigational drugs
- Regulation of therapeutic goods, rules in different countries.
