= New Animal Drug Application =

A New Animal Drug Application is an American legal terminology, defined in 21 CFR ¶514, after the definition in ¶510 of the term New Animal Drug. It is utilized by the Food and Drug Administration. A new animal drug is defined, in part, as any drug intended for use in animals other than man, including any drug intended for use in animal feed but not including the animal feed, the composition of which is such that the drug is not generally recognized as safe and effective for the use under the conditions prescribed, recommended, or suggested in the labeling of the drug. It was mandated by the Federal Food, Drug, and Cosmetic Act, as modified by Food and Drug Administration Amendments Act of 2007 on 27 September 2007, and is the analogue of the New Drug Application for humans.

== Types ==
There are three different types of new animal drug applications:

- NADA – A NADA is used to seek approval of a new animal drug.
- ANADA – An ANADA is used to seek approval of a generic new animal drug. A generic new animal drug is a copy of an approved new animal drug for which patents or other periods of exclusivity are near expiration.
- CNADA – A CNADA is used to seek conditional approval of a new animal drug. A conditionally approved CNADA has met all the requirements to support the full approval of the new animal drug except for a demonstration of “substantial evidence of effectiveness.” For a CNADA, the applicant must demonstrate a “reasonable expectation of effectiveness.” A conditionally approved CNADA allows the applicant to legally market the new animal drug for up to 5 years, provided FDA approves the required annual renewal requests, while the applicant continues to collect the effectiveness data needed to meet the “substantial evidence” standard for full approval.
