= Myotubularin 1 =

Protein-coding gene in the species Homo sapiens

MTM1

Identifiers
- Aliases: MTM1, CNM, MTMX, XLMTM, Myotubularin 1, myotubularin, CNMX
- External IDs: OMIM: 300415; MGI: 1099452; GeneCards: MTM1
Enzyme activity
EC #	BRENDA	ExPASy	KEGG	MetaCyc
3.1.3.95	↗	↗	↗	↗

Gene location (Human)
Chr.	X chromosome (human)
Band	Xq28	Start	150,568,417 bp
Band	Xq28	End	150,673,143 bp

Gene location (Mouse)
Chr.	X chromosome (mouse)
Band	X A7.2- A7.3|X 36.55 cM	Start	70,254,373 bp
Band	X A7.2- A7.3|X 36.55 cM	End	70,359,297 bp
RNA expression pattern
Bgee	Human / Mouse (ortholog); Top expressed in: secondary oocyte; rectum; germinal epithelium; monocyte; mucosa of colon; mucosa of sigmoid colon; jejunal mucosa; epithelium of colon; Achilles tendon; bone marrow cell / Top expressed in: left colon; jejunum; Epithelium of choroid plexus; lobe of cerebellum; ileum; soleus muscle; cerebellar vermis; brown adipose tissue; granulocyte; myocardium of ventricle; More reference expression data
BioGPS	n/a
Gene ontology
Molecular function	phosphoprotein phosphatase activity; intermediate filament binding; phosphatase activity; protein binding; phosphatidylinositol binding; protein tyrosine phosphatase activity; hydrolase activity; phosphatidylinositol-3-phosphatase activity; phosphatidylinositol-3,5-bisphosphate 3-phosphatase activity
Cellular component	cytoplasm; endosome; late endosome; cell projection; membrane; I band; filopodium; ruffle; plasma membrane; cytosol; sarcomere
Biological process	negative regulation of autophagosome assembly; negative regulation of protein kinase B signaling; muscle cell cellular homeostasis; lipid metabolism; protein dephosphorylation; negative regulation of TOR signaling; mitochondrion distribution; negative regulation of proteasomal ubiquitin-dependent protein catabolic process; protein transport; phosphatidylinositol biosynthetic process; peptidyl-tyrosine dephosphorylation; mitochondrion morphogenesis; positive regulation of skeletal muscle tissue growth; dephosphorylation; endosome to lysosome transport; regulation of vacuole organization; intermediate filament organization; phosphatidylinositol dephosphorylation
Sources:Amigo / QuickGO
Orthologs
Databases	NCBI: entry; OMA: entry
Species	Human	Mouse
Entrez	4534	17772
Ensembl	ENSG00000171100	ENSMUSG00000031337
UniProt	Q13496	Q9Z2C5
RefSeq (mRNA)	NM_000252; NM_001376906; NM_001376907; NM_001376908	NM_001164190; NM_001164191; NM_001164192; NM_001164193; NM_019926 NM_001358113
RefSeq (protein)	NP_000243; NP_001363835; NP_001363836; NP_001363837	NP_001157662; NP_001157663; NP_001157664; NP_001157665; NP_064310 NP_001345042
Location (UCSC)	Chr X: 150.57 – 150.67 Mb	Chr X: 70.25 – 70.36 Mb
PubMed search
- Wikidata
View/Edit Human	View/Edit Mouse

Myotubularin is a protein that in humans is encoded by the MTM1 gene.

This gene is a member of a gene family that encodes lipid phosphatases. Myotubularin is required for muscle cell differentiation and mutations in this gene have been identified as being responsible for X-linked myotubular myopathy.
