= X-linked myotubular myopathy =

- Other names: XLMTM
- This condition is inherited in an X-linked recessive manner.

X-linked myotubular myopathy (MTM) is a form of centronuclear myopathy (CNM) associated with mutations in the myotubularin 1 gene. It is predominantly found in male infants. It is one of the most severe forms of congenital muscle disease, characterized by marked muscle weakness, hypotonia, and difficulty with feeding and breathing. Abbreviations such as XL-MTM, XLMTM or X-MTM are sometimes used to emphasize that the mutation occurs on the X chromosome.

== Genetics ==
MTM is caused by mutations in the myotubularin gene (MTM1), located on the long arm of the X chromosome (Xq28). Because males have only one X chromosome, they are at greater risk for diseases stemming from mutations encoded in it; this is why X-linked MTM is most commonly observed in males. Females can be "carriers" for an X-linked genetic abnormality, but often will not be clinically affected themselves, as they have a second wildtype copy of MTM1.

There are, however, two scenarios where a female with an X-linked recessive abnormality would display clinical symptoms: manifesting carrier, and X-inactivation. A manifesting carrier usually has no noticeable problems at birth, with symptoms showing up later in life. With X-inactivation, one of the female's X chromosome copies is silenced, preventing the wildtype gene from expressing and forcing symptomatic expression of the mutated MTM1. Thus, she congenitally presents (is born with) MTM. Girls with myopathy and a muscle biopsy showing a centronuclear pattern should be tested for MTM1 mutations.

== Research ==
Astellas Gene Therapies (earlier called Audentes Therapeutics) is developing an experimental gene therapy to treat the condition. A clinical trial was halted in 2020 after two boys participating in the trial died of liver inflammation and sepsis.
