= Advanced Therapy Medicinal Product =

Therapeutic drugs based on cell therapy or gene therapy

Advanced Therapy Medicinal Products, or ATMPs, are advanced therapeutic drugs that are based on cell therapy or gene therapy (sometimes in combination with a medical device - where they are then called a tissue engineered product). The criteria to which a drug must conform to be classified as an ATMP, are defined in Article 17 of Regulation (EC) No 1394/2007 by the European Commission.

== Development and approval specifics in different countries ==
Development of ATMPs is typically highly experimental and often begins in academic research settings, such as universities and their hospitals. This, together with individualized manufacturing—often on a small scale for the treatment of serious, and frequently rare, diseases—has so far meant that the traditional (capital-rich) pharmaceutical industry has been almost entirely absent from this drug sector. Consequently, therapeutic concepts cannot reach market maturity due to lack of financial support for conducting clinical trials and limited regulatory experience (for example, complying with legal requirements to obtain marketing authorisation). A number of products from the heterogeneous group of ATMPs have now been approved, mainly for patients with rare diseases or for those for whom effective standard treatments are lacking. Because of the small number of cases, systematic collection of real-world clinical practice data in the post-approval phase is of particular importance for further study.

=== European Union ===
Authorization procedures for ATMPs differ between EU countries. Various protocols and regulatory frameworks are in place.

In the Member States of the European Union (EU) ATMPs must be authorised at the EU level (centralised) through the European Medicines Agency (EMA). For example, Czech Act No. 378/2007 Coll. on Pharmaceuticals recognises only medicinal products for cell and gene therapy. However, the EU directive is directly applicable.

==== Criteria for clinical use ====
There are a few legal options available in terms of using ATMP at patients:

- ATMP: product is centrally approved by EMA
- ATIMP: product is used in an officially registered clinical study
- ATMP-HE: product is used in an experimental therapy which is run under hospital exemption or similar procedure

In any case production of ATMP undergoes Good Manufacturing Practice (GMP) requirements.

Before an ATMP can be administered to a patient, several criteria must be met:

- Marketing authorisation by the EMA, unless exceptions apply
- Demonstration of quality, safety, and efficacy through clinical trials
- Compliance with Good Manufacturing Practice (GMP) standards
- Appropriate risk–benefit assessment for the target population
- Administration in authorised clinical settings by qualified personnel

Patient eligibility is typically defined by specific clinical indications, disease severity and lack of effective alternative treatments.

==== Special regulatory pathways ====
In addition to standard authorisation, several alternative pathways exist in the European Union.

===== Hospital exemption =====
Under Article 28 of Regulation (EC) No 1394/2007, ATMPs may be used without centralised authorisation under the "hospital exemption". This applies when:

- The product is prepared on a non-routine basis
- It is used within the same Member State
- It is administered under the responsibility of a medical practitioner

Under the hospital exemption pathway, ATMPs are typically manufactured on a patient-specific basis and used within a single Member State under the responsibility of a medical practitioner. This exemption is subject to national regulatory oversight, which may vary between countries in terms of implementation and supervision. The scope and accessibility of hospital exemption pathways differ across the European Union, leading to variability in patient access to such therapies. The hospital exemption is a recognised and regulated pathway for access to advanced therapies within the EU legal framework, providing an alternative route when centralised marketing authorisation is not feasible. Financing of therapies provided under this pathway is determined at the national level and may include coverage through public healthcare systems, hospital budgets, or case-by-case reimbursement decisions by payers including patients. Funding models differ between Member States, with some countries integrating such treatments into national health insurance schemes, while others rely on individual funding approvals or research-based financing mechanisms.

ATMPs may also be made available through conditional marketing authorisation, approval under exceptional circumstances, PRIority MEdicines (PRIME) scheme. These pathways are intended to accelerate access for patients with unmet medical needs.

==== Financing and reimbursement ====
Financing of ATMPs in Europe varies significantly between countries due to differences in healthcare systems. After EMA approval, ATMPs must undergo Health Technology Assessment (HTA) at the national level. Reimbursement decisions are made by national health authorities or insurers. Due to the high cost of ATMPs, alternative financing mechanisms are used, including outcome-based agreements, installment-based payments and risk-sharing agreements.

=== United States ===
Although hospital exemption is a provision of the European Union, non-European countries provide similar exceptions in their legislation. In the United States there is a possibility of applying an analogous exception for patients who do not meet the inclusion criteria for a clinical trial testing the use of an anticancer drug or another drug, biological product (including cell-based products), or a medical device for any serious or life-threatening disease. The legal basis is the Federal Food, Drug, and Cosmetic Act (FD&C Act), and access to the investigational product is granted upon a physician's request through an Investigational New Drug Application (IND) or an Investigational Device Exemption (IDE). In addition, right-to-try laws are in force in 30 U.S. states under state legislation.

=== Saudi Arabia ===
In Saudi Arabia these matters are handled by the Saudi Food and Drug Authority (SFDA). Registration requires submission of specific clinical information, as well as information on chemical composition, manufacturing and quality control (CMC) to demonstrate compliance with the SFDA's requirements for drug approval.

=== Brazil ===
In Brazil the regulatory framework includes the following provisions:

- IN 270/2023 establishes good manufacturing practices for products intended for advanced therapy;
- RDC 506/2021 - establishes the rules for conducting clinical trials with investigational advanced therapy products in Brazil
- RDC 505/2021 - provides for the registration of advanced therapy products.

=== Other countries ===
Individual access under principles comparable to hospital exemption is possible in Canada, Australia, South Korea, and Japan, where 70% of the cost of such therapy is reimbursed while 30% is paid by the patient. In some countries, individual access is considered equivalent to a phase 0 clinical trial.
