= Lentiviral vector in gene therapy =

Method of gene modification

Lentiviral vectors in gene therapy is a method by which genes can be inserted, modified, or deleted in organisms using lentiviruses.

Lentiviruses are a family of viruses that are responsible for diseases like AIDS, which infect by inserting DNA into their host cells' genome. Many such viruses have been the basis of research using viruses in gene therapy, but the lentivirus is unique in its ability to infect non-dividing cells, and therefore has a wider range of potential applications. Lentiviruses can become endogenous (ERV), integrating their genome into the host germline genome, so that the virus is henceforth inherited by the host's descendants. Scientists use the lentivirus' mechanisms of infection to achieve a desired outcome to gene therapy. Lentiviral vectors in gene therapy have been pioneered by Luigi Naldini.

Structure of a virion of HIV, a type of lentivirus. A membrane with protruding glycoproteins surrounds a capsid containing enzymes and the viral RNA genome.

The lentivirus is a retrovirus, meaning it has a single stranded RNA genome with a reverse transcriptase enzyme. Lentiviruses also have a viral envelope with protruding glycoproteins that aid in attachment to the host cell's outer membrane. The virus contains a reverse transcriptase molecule found to perform transcription of the viral genetic material upon entering the cell. Within the viral genome are RNA sequences that code for specific proteins that facilitate the incorporation of the viral sequences into the host cell genome. The "gag" gene codes for the structural components of the viral nucleocapsid proteins: the matrix (MA/p17), the capsid (CA/p24) and the nucleocapsid (NC/p7) proteins. The "pol" domain codes for the reverse transcriptase and integrase enzymes. Lastly, the "env" domain of the viral genome encodes for the glycoproteins and envelope on the surface of the virus.

There are multiple steps involved in the infection and replication of a lentivirus in a host cell. In the first step the virus uses its surface glycoproteins for attachment to the outer surface of a cell. More specifically, lentiviruses attach to the CD4 glycoproteins on the surface of a host's target cell. The viral material is then injected into the host cell's cytoplasm. Within the cytoplasm, the viral reverse transcriptase enzyme performs reverse transcription of the viral RNA genome to create a viral DNA genome. The viral DNA is then sent into the nucleus of the host cell where it is incorporated into the host cell's genome with the help of the viral enzyme integrase. From now on, the host cell starts to transcribe the entire viral RNA and express the structural viral proteins, in particular those that form the viral capsid and the envelope. The lentiviral RNA and the viral proteins then assemble and the newly formed virions leave the host cell when enough are made.

Two methods of gene therapy using lentiviruses have been proposed. In the ex vivo methodology, cells are extracted from a patient and then cultured. A lentiviral vector carrying therapeutic transgenes are then introduced to the culture to infect them. The now modified cells continue to be cultured until they can be infused into the patient. In vivo gene therapy is the simple injection of viral vectors containing transgenes into the patient.

== Designing a lentivirus vector ==
Lentiviruses are modified to act as a vector to insert beneficial genes into cells. Unlike other retroviruses, which cannot penetrate the nuclear envelope and can therefore only act on cells while they are undergoing mitosis, lentiviruses can infect cells whether or not they are dividing (shown to be largely due to the capsid protein). Many cell types, like neurons, do not divide in adult organisms, so lentiviral gene therapy is a good candidate for treating conditions that affect those cell types.

Some experimental applications of lentiviral vectors have been done in gene therapy in order to cure diseases like Diabetes mellitus, Murine haemophilia A, prostate cancer, chronic granulomatous disease, and vascular diseases.

HIV-derived lentiviral vectors have been widely developed for their ability to target specific genes through the coactivator PSIP1. This target specificity allows for the development of lentiviral gene vectors that do not carry the risk of randomly inserting themselves into normally functioning genes. As HIV is pathogenic, it must be genetically modified to remove its disease-causing properties and its ability to replicate itself. This can be achieved by deleting viral genes that are unnecessary for transduction of therapeutic transgenes. It has been proposed that by targeting the "gag" and "env" domains, enough of the HIV-1 genome can be deleted without losing its effectiveness in gene therapy while minimizing viral genes integrated into the patient. Genes may also be replaced rather than disrupted as another method to reduce the risks associated with the use of HIV-1.

Other lentiviruses such as Feline immunodeficiency virus and Equine infectious anemia virus have been developed for use in gene therapy and are of interest due to the inability to cause serious disease in human hosts. Equine infectious anemia virus in particular has been shown to perform somewhat better than HIV-1 in hematopoietic stem cells

== Insertional mutagenesis ==
Historically, lentiviral vectors included strong viral promoters which had a side effect of insertional mutagenesis, nuclear DNA mutations that affect the function of a gene. These strong viral promotors were shown to be the main cause of cancer formation. As a result, viral promotors have been replaced by cellular promotors and regulatory sequences.

== Contrast with other viral vectors ==
As mentioned, lentiviruses have the unique ability to infect non-dividing cells. Beyond that, there are several other properties that distinguish lentiviral vectors from other viral vectors. Such properties are important to consider when determining whether lentiviruses are appropriate for a given treatment.

=== Gammaretroviruses ===
Gammaretroviruses are retroviruses like lentiviruses. Murine leukemia viruses (MLVs) were among the first to be investigated for their use in gene therapy. However, recent research has favored lentiviruses for their ability to integrate into non-dividing cells. More practically, gammaretroviruses have an affinity for integrating themselves near oncogene promoters, bringing forward an adverse risk of tumors. MLVs may be replication competent, meaning they can replicate in the host cell. These replication-competent viruses offer stable gene transfer and tumor and tissue specific targeting.

=== Adenoviruses ===
In gene therapy, adenoviruses differ from lentiviruses in many ways, some of which provide advantages over lentiviruses. Transduction efficiency is higher in adenoviruses compared to lentiviruses. Secondly, most human cells have receptors for adenoviruses likely as a result of the wide variety of adenovirus diseases in humans. As adenoviruses frequently infect humans, this could build an immune response in the body. Such a response can reduce the efficiency of adenoviral vector therapies and can result in adverse reactions such as inflammation of tissues. Research has been conducted to exploit this immune response to target cancerous cells and to develop vaccines. Hybrid adenovirus-retroviruses (specifically MLVs) have also been developed to exploit the benefits of MLVs and adenoviruses.

== Applications ==
=== Severe combined immunodeficiency disease ===
The ADA deficient variant of severe combined immunodeficiency (SCID) was treated highly successfully in a multi-year study reported in 2021. Over 95% of treated patients continued to be event free after 36 months, and 100% of patients survived this normally lethal disease. A self-inactivating lentiviral vector, EFS-ADA LV, was used to insert a functional ADA gene in autologous CD34+ hematopoietic stem and progenitor cells (HSPCs).

=== Vascular transplants ===
In a study designed to enhance the outcomes of vascular transplant through vascular endothelial cell gene therapy, the third generation of Lentivirus showed to be effective in the delivery of genes to moderate venous grafts and transplants in procedures like coronary artery bypass. Because the virus has been adapted to lose most of its genome, the virus becomes safer and more effective in transplanting the required genes into the host cell. A drawback to this therapy is explained in the study that long-term gene expression may require the use of promoters and can aid in a greater trans-gene expression. The researchers accomplished this by the addition of self-inactivating plasmids and creating a more universal tropism by pseudotyping a vesicular stomatitis virus glycoprotein.

=== Chronic granulomatous disease ===
In chronic granulomatous disease (CGD), immune functioning is deficient as a result of the mutations in components of the nicotinamide adenine dinucleotide phosphate oxidase (NADPH oxidase) enzyme in phagocyte cells, which catalyzes the production of superoxide free radicals. If this enzyme becomes deficient, the phagocytes can't kill effectively the engulfed bacteria, so granulomas can be formed. Study performed in mice emphasizes the use of lineage-specific lentiviral vectors to express a normal version of one of the mutant CGD proteins, allowing white blood cells to now make a functional version of the NADPH oxidase. Scientists developed this strain of lentivirus by transinfecting 293T cells with pseudotyped virus with the vesicular stomatitis G protein. The viral vector's responsibility was to increase the production of a functional NADPH oxidase gene in these phagocytic cells. They did this to create an affinity for myeloid cells.

=== Prostate cancer ===
With prostate cancer, the lentivirus is transformed by being bound to trastuzumab to attach to androgen-sensitive LNCaP and castration-resistant C4-2 human prostate cancer cell lines. These two cells are primarily responsible for secretion of excess human epidermal growth factor receptor 2 (HER-2), which is a hormone linked to prostate cancer. By attaching to these cells and changing their genomes, the lentivirus can slow down, and even kill, the cancer-causing cells. Researchers caused the specificity of the vector by manipulating the Fab region of the viral genome and pseudotyped it with the Sindbis virus.

=== Haemophilia A ===
Haemophilia A has also been studied in gene therapy with a lentiviral vector in mice. The vector targets the haematopoietic cells in order to increase the amount of factor VIII, which is affected in haemophilia A. But this continues to be a subject of study as the lentivirus vector was not completely successful in achieving this goal. They did this by trans-infecting the virus in a 293T cell, creating a virus known as 2bF8 expressing generation of viral vectors.

=== Rheumatoid arthritis ===
Studies have also found that injection of a lentiviral vector with IL-10 expressing genes in utero in mice can suppress, and prevent, rheumatoid arthritis and create new cells with constant gene expression. This contributes to the data on stem cells and in utero inoculation of viral vectors for gene therapy. The target for the viral vector in this study, were the synovial cells. Normally functioning synovial cells produce TNFα and IL-1.

=== Diabetes mellitus ===
Like many of the in utero studies, the lentiviral vector gene therapy for diabetes mellitus is more effective in utero as the stem cells that become affected by the gene therapy create new cells with the new gene created by the actual viral intervention. The vector targets the cells within the pancreas to add insulin secreting genes to help control diabetes mellitus. Vectors were cloned using a cytomegalovirus promoter and then co-transinfected in the 293T cell.

=== Neurological disease ===
As mature neurons do not divide, lentiviruses are ideal for division independent gene therapy. Studies of lentiviral gene therapy have been conducted on patients with advanced Parkinson's disease and aging-related atrophy of neurons in primates.

== See also ==
- Retinal gene therapy using lentiviral vectors
