= Biologics license application =

License

A biologics license application (BLA) is defined by the U.S. Food and Drug Administration (FDA) as follows:

The biologics license application is a request for permission to introduce, or deliver for introduction, a biologic product into interstate commerce (21 CFR 601.2). The BLA is regulated under 21 CFR 600 – 680. A BLA is submitted by any legal person or entity who is engaged in manufacture or an applicant for a license who takes responsibility for compliance with product and establishment standards. Form 356h specifies the requirements for a BLA. This includes:

- Applicant information
- Product/manufacturing information
- Pre-clinical studies
- Clinical studies
- Labeling

Some biological products are regulated by the Center for Drug Evaluation and Research (CDER) while others are regulated by the Center for Biologics Evaluation and Research (CBER).

A BLA is submitted after the investigational new drug (IND) phase, once the clinical investigations are completed. If the Form 356h is missing information, the FDA will reply within 74 days. A BLA asserts that the product is "safe, pure, and potent", the manufacturing facilities are inspectable, and each package of the product bears the license number. Statutory standards for BLA approval are largely the same as those for New Drug Application approval. According to 21 CFR 600.3, FDA interprets "potency" to include effectiveness of the biologic.

After approval, annual reports, reports on adverse events, manufacturing changes, and labeling changes must be submitted.

== See also ==
- New drug application
- Investigational new drug
