= List of gene therapies =

This article contains a list of commercially available gene therapies.

== Gene therapies ==
- Alipogene tiparvovec (Glybera): AAV-based treatment for lipoprotein lipase deficiency (no longer commercially available)
- Axicabtagene ciloleucel (Yescarta): treatment for large B-cell lymphoma
- Beremagene geperpavec (Vyjuvek): treatment of wounds.
- Betibeglogene autotemcel (Zynteglo): treatment for beta thalassemia
- Brexucabtagene autoleucel (Tecartus): treatment for mantle cell lymphoma and acute lymphoblastic leukemia
- Cambiogenplasmid (Neovasculgen): treatment for vascular endothelial growth factor peripheral artery disease
- Ciltacabtagene autoleucel (Carvykti): treatment for multiple myeloma
- Delandistrogene moxeparvovec (Elevidys): treatment for Duchenne muscular dystrophy
- Elivaldogene autotemcel (Skysona): treatment for cerebral adrenoleukodystrophy
- Etranacogene dezaparvovec (Hemgenix): AAV-based treatment for hemophilia B
- Exagamglogene autotemcel (Casgevy): treatment for sickle cell disease.
- Gendicine: treatment for head and neck squamous cell carcinoma
- Idecabtagene vicleucel (Abecma): treatment for multiple myeloma
- Lovotibeglogene autotemcel (Lyfgenia): treatment for sickle cell disease.
- Marnetegragene autotemcel (Kresladi): treatment of severe leukocyte adhesion deficiency type I.
- Nadofaragene firadenovec (Adstiladrin): treatment for bladder cancer
- Obecabtagene autoleucel (Aucatzyl): treatment of acute lymphoblastic leukemia
- Onasemnogene abeparvovec (Zolgensma): AAV-based treatment for spinal muscular atrophy
- Pariglasgene brecaparvovec (Genglycos): glycogen storage disease type Ia
- Prademagene zamikeracel (Zevaskyn): recessive dystrophic epidermolysis bullosa
- Rebisufligene etisparvovec (Fayuvi): treatment of mucopolysaccharidosis type IIIA
- Revakinagene taroretcel (Encelto): treatment of macular telangiectasia type 2
- Strimvelis: treatment for adenosine deaminase deficiency (ADA-SCID)
- Talimogene laherparepvec (Imlygic): treatment for melanoma in people who have recurring skin lesions
- Tisagenlecleucel (Kymriah): treatment for B cell lymphoblastic leukemia
- Valoctocogene roxaparvovec (Roctavian): treatment for hemophilia A
- Voretigene neparvovec (Luxturna): AAV-based treatment for Leber congenital amaurosis

== See also ==
- FDA-approved CAR T cell therapies
