= 2025 in biotechnology =

Biotechnology in 2025 refers to the applications of biological science and technology across medicine, agriculture, industry, and the environment during the year 2025. The field has seen rapid advances in genetic engineering, synthetic biology, artificial intelligence integration, and sustainable biomanufacturing. The global biotechnology market has expanded significantly, driven by demand for personalised medicine, alternative proteins, and environmentally friendly industrial processes.

== Key areas of development ==
=== Healthcare ===
Biotechnology in 2025 continued its expansion in the medical field, with a focus on gene therapy, cell therapy, and RNA vaccine platforms. CRISPR-based technologies transitioned further from laboratory research into clinical application, with regulatory milestones and new clinical trial approvals. For example, in April 2025, the FDA approved Abeona Therapeutics' Zevaskyn, a cell-based gene therapy for the rare skin disorder dystrophic epidermolysis bullosa. This approval was notable for being the first of its kind for the condition and demonstrated the growing viability of gene-edited therapies.

The integration of artificial intelligence (AI) became more widespread, particularly in drug discovery and patient data analysis. Companies used AI-driven platforms to predict drug effectiveness, analyze complex genomic data, and shorten clinical trial timelines. AI-enabled platforms are also used to analyze real-time patient data from wearable technology to personalize treatment plans.

=== Agriculture and food ===
Agricultural biotechnology focused on developing climate-resilient crops and sustainable food production methods. Gene-editing tools were used to create crop varieties with increased fungal resistance and improved nutrient profiles, aiming to reduce the reliance on chemical inputs.

In food technology, the commercial viability of cultivated meat and precision fermentation improved. Several companies received regulatory approval to expand their offerings of alternative proteins, and new pilot plants were established to scale up production. These technologies are positioned as lower-emission alternatives to traditional animal agriculture.

=== Industrial and environmental ===
Industrial biotechnology saw significant growth in the circular economy. Biomanufacturing of bio-based plastics and green chemicals expanded, offering sustainable alternatives to petroleum-based products. Engineered microbes were increasingly used in bioremediation and carbon capture, with projects focusing on converting industrial waste gases into valuable bioproducts. For example, some firms have developed genetically engineered algae that can capture carbon dioxide from the atmosphere and convert it into bioplastics and biofuels.

== Global market overview ==
The global biotechnology market continued its growth trajectory in 2025. According to a report by Precedence Research, the global market size was valued at approximately USD 1.74 trillion, with a strong outlook for continued expansion driven by rising demand for biologics and personalized medicine. North America maintained its position as a market leader, while the Asia-Pacific region emerged as the fastest-growing market due to increased investments and a rising prevalence of chronic diseases.

According to industry analyses, the global biotechnology market in 2025 is valued at over USD 1.5 trillion, with strong regional growth across healthcare, agriculture, and industrial applications.

== Ethics and regulation ==
The expansion of biotechnology raised significant ethical concerns, particularly regarding human germline editing, synthetic biology, and equitable access to advanced therapies. Regulatory bodies like the European Medicines Agency and the U.S. Food and Drug Administration continued to update their frameworks to balance innovation with safety and biosecurity. The European Union, for example, initiated preparatory work on the proposed EU Biotech Act, which aims to streamline regulatory processes while addressing dual-use risks and data privacy concerns, particularly in AI-driven healthcare. Public discussions also focused on the ethical use of AI, including potential algorithmic bias in diagnostics and the transparency of data usage in healthcare.

== See also ==
- Timeline of biotechnology#2020s
- Synthetic biology
- Personalized medicine
- Genetic engineering
- Industrial biotechnology
