= Gene therapy =

Medical technology

Gene therapy is medical technology that aims to produce a therapeutic effect through the manipulation of gene expression or through altering the biological properties of living cells.

The first attempt at modifying human DNA was performed in 1980, by Martin Cline, but the first successful nuclear gene transfer in humans, approved by the National Institutes of Health, was performed in May 1989. The first therapeutic use of gene transfer as well as the first direct insertion of human DNA into the nuclear genome was performed by French Anderson in a trial starting in September 1990. Between 1989 and December 2018, over 2,900 clinical trials were conducted, with more than half of them in phase I. In 2003, Gendicine became the first gene therapy to receive regulatory approval. Since that time, further gene therapy drugs were approved, such as alipogene tiparvovec (2012), Strimvelis (2016), tisagenlecleucel (2017), voretigene neparvovec (2017), patisiran (2018), onasemnogene abeparvovec (2019), idecabtagene vicleucel (2021), nadofaragene firadenovec, valoctocogene roxaparvovec and etranacogene dezaparvovec (all 2022).

Most of gene therapy approaches have utilized adeno-associated viruses (AAVs) and lentiviruses for performing gene insertions, in vivo and ex vivo, respectively. AAVs are characterized by stabilizing the viral capsid, lower immunogenicity, ability to transduce both dividing and nondividing cells, the potential to integrate site specifically and to achieve long-term expression in the in-vivo treatment. ASO / siRNA approaches such as those conducted by Alnylam and Ionis Pharmaceuticals require non-viral delivery systems, and utilize alternative mechanisms for trafficking to liver cells by way of GalNAc transporters.

Not all medical procedures that introduce alterations to a patient's genetic makeup can be considered gene therapy. Bone marrow transplantation and organ transplants in general have been found to introduce foreign DNA into patients.

== Background ==
Gene therapy was first conceptualized in the 1960s, when the feasibility of adding new genetic functions to mammalian cells began to be researched. Several methods to do so were tested, including injecting genes with a micropipette directly into a living mammalian cell, and exposing cells to a precipitate of DNA that contained the desired genes. Scientists theorized that a virus could also be used as a vehicle, or vector, to deliver new genes into cells.

One of the first scientists to report the successful direct incorporation of functional DNA into a mammalian cell was biochemist Dr. Lorraine Marquardt Kraus (6 September 1922 – 1 July 2016) at the University of Tennessee Health Science Center in Memphis, Tennessee. In 1961, she managed to genetically alter the hemoglobin of cells from bone marrow taken from a patient with sickle cell anaemia. She did this by incubating the patient's cells in tissue culture with DNA extracted from a donor with normal hemoglobin. In 1968, researchers Theodore Friedmann, Jay Seegmiller, and John Subak-Sharpe at the National Institutes of Health (NIH), Bethesda, in the United States successfully corrected genetic defects associated with Lesch-Nyhan syndrome, a debilitating neurological disease, by adding foreign DNA to cultured cells collected from patients suffering from the disease.

The first attempt, an unsuccessful one, at gene therapy (as well as the first case of medical transfer of foreign genes into humans not counting organ transplantation) was performed by geneticist Martin Cline of the University of California, Los Angeles in California, United States on 10 July 1980. Cline claimed that one of the genes in his patients was active six months later, though he never published this data or had it verified.

After extensive research on animals throughout the 1980s and a 1989 bacterial gene tagging trial on humans, the first gene therapy widely accepted as a success was demonstrated in a trial that started on 14 September 1990, when Ashanthi DeSilva was treated for ADA-SCID.

The first somatic treatment that produced a permanent genetic change was initiated in 1993. The goal was to cure malignant brain tumors by using recombinant DNA to transfer a gene making the tumor cells sensitive to a drug that in turn would cause the tumor cells to die.

The polymers are either translated into proteins, interfere with target gene expression, or possibly correct genetic mutations. The most common form uses DNA that encodes a functional, therapeutic gene to replace a mutated gene. The polymer molecule is packaged within a "vector", which carries the molecule inside cells.

Early clinical failures led to dismissals of gene therapy. Clinical successes since 2006 regained researchers' attention, although as of 2014, it was still largely an experimental technique. These include treatment of retinal diseases Leber's congenital amaurosis and choroideremia, X-linked SCID, ADA-SCID, adrenoleukodystrophy, chronic lymphocytic leukemia (CLL), acute lymphocytic leukemia (ALL), multiple myeloma, haemophilia, and Parkinson's disease. Between 2013 and April 2014, US companies invested over $600 million in the field.

The first commercial gene therapy, Gendicine, was approved in China in 2003, for the treatment of certain cancers. In 2011, Neovasculgen was registered in Russia as the first-in-class gene-therapy drug for treatment of peripheral artery disease, including critical limb ischemia. In 2012, alipogene tiparvovec, a treatment for a rare inherited disorder, lipoprotein lipase deficiency, became the first treatment to be approved for clinical use in either the European Union or the United States after its endorsement by the European Commission.

Following early advances in genetic engineering of bacteria, cells, and small animals, scientists started considering how to apply it to medicine. Two main approaches were considered – replacing or disrupting defective genes. Scientists focused on diseases caused by single-gene defects, such as cystic fibrosis, haemophilia, muscular dystrophy, thalassemia, and sickle cell anemia. alipogene tiparvovec treats one such disease, caused by a defect in lipoprotein lipase.

DNA must be administered, reach the damaged cells, enter the cell and either express or disrupt a protein. Multiple delivery techniques have been explored. The initial approach incorporated DNA into an engineered virus to deliver the DNA into a chromosome. Naked DNA approaches have also been explored, especially in the context of vaccine development.

Generally, efforts focused on administering a gene that causes a needed protein to be expressed. More recently, increased understanding of nuclease function has led to more direct DNA editing, using techniques such as zinc finger nucleases and CRISPR. The vector incorporates genes into chromosomes. The expressed nucleases then knock out and replace genes in the chromosome. As of 2014 these approaches involve removing cells from patients, editing a chromosome and returning the transformed cells to patients.

Gene editing is a potential approach to alter the human genome to treat genetic diseases, viral diseases, and cancer. As of 2020 these approaches are being studied in clinical trials.

== Classification ==
=== Breadth of Definition ===
In 1986, a meeting at the Institute Of Medicine defined gene therapy as the addition or replacement of a gene in a targeted cell type. In the same year, the FDA announced that it had jurisdiction over approving "gene therapy" without defining the term. The FDA added a very broad definition in 1993 of any treatment that would 'modify or manipulate the expression of genetic material or to alter the biological properties of living cells'. In 2018 this was narrowed to 'products that mediate their effects by transcription or translation of transferred genetic material or by specifically altering host (human) genetic sequences'.

Writing in 2018, in the Journal of Law and the Biosciences, Sherkow et al. argued for a narrower definition of gene therapy than the FDA's in light of new technology that would consist of any treatment that intentionally and permanently modified a cell's genome, with the definition of genome including episomes outside the nucleus but excluding changes due to episomes that are lost over time. This definition would also exclude introducing cells that did not derive from a patient themselves, but include ex vivo approaches, and would not depend on the vector used.

During the COVID-19 pandemic, some academics insisted that the mRNA vaccines for COVID were not gene therapy to prevent the spread of incorrect information that the vaccine could alter DNA, other academics maintained that the vaccines were a gene therapy because they introduced genetic material into a cell. Fact-checkers, such as Full Fact, Reuters, PolitiFact, and FactCheck.org said that calling the vaccines a gene therapy was incorrect. Podcast host Joe Rogan was criticized for calling mRNA vaccines gene therapy as was British politician Andrew Bridgen, with fact checker Full Fact calling for Bridgen to be removed from the conservative party for this and other statements.

=== Genes present or added ===
Gene therapy encapsulates many forms of adding different nucleic acids to a cell. Gene augmentation adds a new protein coding gene to a cell. One form of gene augmentation is gene replacement therapy, a treatment for monogenic recessive disorders where a single gene is not functional; an additional functional gene is added. For diseases caused by multiple genes or a dominant gene, gene silencing or gene editing approaches are more appropriate but gene addition, a form of gene augmentation where new gene is added, may improve a cell's function without modifying the genes that cause a disorder.

=== Cell types ===
Gene therapy may be classified into two types by the type of cell it affects: somatic cell and germline gene therapy.

In somatic cell gene therapy (SCGT), the therapeutic genes are transferred into any cell other than a gamete, germ cell, gametocyte, or undifferentiated stem cell. Any such modifications affect the individual patient only, and are not inherited by offspring. Somatic gene therapy represents mainstream basic and clinical research, in which therapeutic DNA (either integrated in the genome or as an external episome or plasmid) is used to treat disease. Over 600 clinical trials utilizing SCGT are underway in the US. Most focus on severe genetic disorders, including immunodeficiencies, haemophilia, thalassaemia, and cystic fibrosis. Such single gene disorders are good candidates for somatic cell therapy. The complete correction of a genetic disorder or the replacement of multiple genes is not yet possible. Only a few of the trials are in the advanced stages.

In germline gene therapy (GGT), germ cells (sperm or egg cells) are modified by the introduction of functional genes into their genomes. Modifying a germ cell causes all the organism's cells to contain the modified gene. The change is therefore heritable and passed on to later generations. Australia, Canada, Germany, Israel, Switzerland, and the Netherlands prohibit GGT for application in human beings, for technical and ethical reasons, including insufficient knowledge about possible risks to future generations and higher risks versus SCGT. The US has no federal controls specifically addressing human genetic modification (beyond FDA regulations for therapies in general).

=== In vivo versus ex vivo therapies ===
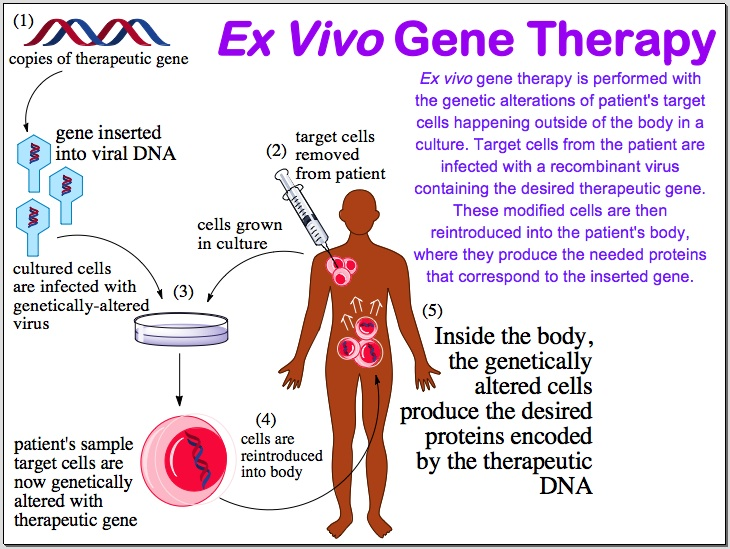

In in vivo gene therapy, a vector (typically, a virus) is introduced to the patient, which then achieves the desired biological effect by passing the genetic material (e.g. for a missing protein) into the patient's cells. In ex vivo gene therapies, such as CAR-T therapeutics, the patient's own cells (autologous) or healthy donor cells (allogeneic) are modified outside the body (hence, ex vivo) using a vector to express a particular protein, such as a chimeric antigen receptor.

In vivo gene therapy is seen as simpler, since it does not require the harvesting of mitotic cells. However, ex vivo gene therapies are better tolerated and less associated with severe immune responses. The death of Jesse Gelsinger in a trial of an adenovirus-vectored treatment for ornithine transcarbamylase deficiency due to a systemic inflammatory reaction led to a temporary halt on gene therapy trials across the United States. As of 2021, in vivo and ex vivo therapeutics are both seen as safe.

=== Gene editing ===
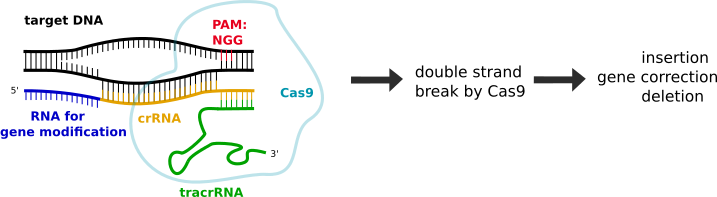
A duplex of crRNA and tracrRNA acts as guide RNA to introduce a specifically located gene modification based on the RNA 5' upstream of the crRNA. Cas9 binds the tracrRNA and needs a DNA binding sequence (5'NGG3'), which is called protospacer adjacent motif (PAM). After binding, Cas9 introduces a DNA double strand break, which is then followed by gene modification via homologous recombination (HDR) or non-homologous end joining (NHEJ).

The concept of gene therapy is to fix a genetic problem at its source. If, for instance, a mutation in a certain gene causes the production of a dysfunctional protein resulting (usually recessively) in an inherited disease, gene therapy could be used to deliver a copy of this gene that does not contain the deleterious mutation and thereby produces a functional protein. This strategy is referred to as gene replacement therapy and could be employed to treat inherited retinal diseases.

While the concept of gene replacement therapy is mostly suitable for recessive diseases, novel strategies have been suggested that are capable of also treating conditions with a dominant pattern of inheritance.

- The introduction of CRISPR gene editing has opened new doors for its application and utilization in gene therapy, as instead of pure replacement of a gene, it enables correction of the particular genetic defect. Solutions to medical hurdles, such as the eradication of latent human immunodeficiency virus (HIV) reservoirs and correction of the mutation that causes sickle cell disease, may be available as a therapeutic option in the future.
- Prosthetic gene therapy aims to enable cells of the body to take over functions they physiologically do not carry out. One example is the so-called vision restoration gene therapy, that aims to restore vision in patients with end-stage retinal diseases. In end-stage retinal diseases, the photoreceptors, as the primary light sensitive cells of the retina are irreversibly lost. By the means of prosthetic gene therapy light sensitive proteins are delivered into the remaining cells of the retina, to render them light sensitive and thereby enable them to signal visual information towards the brain.

In vivo, gene editing systems using CRISPR have been used in studies with mice to treat cancer and have been effective at reducing tumors. In vitro, the CRISPR system has been used to treat HPV cancer tumors. Adeno-associated virus, Lentivirus based vectors have been to introduce the genome for the CRISPR system.

== Vectors ==
The delivery of DNA into cells can be accomplished by multiple methods. The two major classes are recombinant viruses (sometimes called biological nanoparticles or viral vectors) and naked DNA or DNA complexes (non-viral methods).

=== Viruses ===
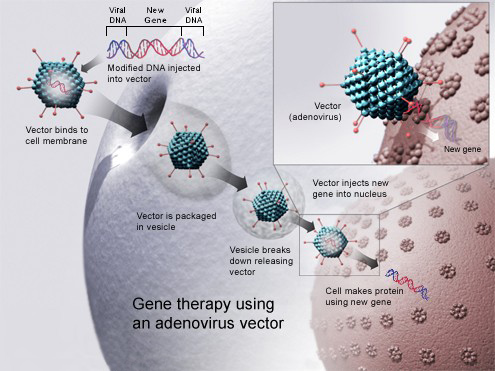
Gene therapy using an adenovirus vector. In some cases, the adenovirus will insert the new gene into a cell. If the treatment is successful, the new gene will make a functional protein to treat a disease.

In order to replicate, viruses introduce their genetic material into the host cell, tricking the host's cellular machinery into using it as blueprints for viral proteins. Retroviruses go a stage further by having their genetic material copied into the nuclear genome of the host cell. Scientists exploit this by substituting part of a virus's genetic material with therapeutic DNA or RNA. Like the genetic material (DNA or RNA) in viruses, therapeutic genetic material can be designed to simply serve as a temporary blueprint that degrades naturally, as in a non-integrative vectors, or to enter the host's nucleus becoming a permanent part of the host's nuclear DNA in infected cells.

A number of viruses have been used for human gene therapy, including viruses such as lentivirus, adenoviruses, herpes simplex, vaccinia, and adeno-associated virus.

Adenovirus viral vectors (Ad) temporarily modify a cell's genetic expression with genetic material that is not integrated into the host cell's DNA. As of 2017, such vectors were used in 20% of trials for gene therapy. Adenovirus vectors are mostly used in cancer treatments and novel genetic vaccines such as the Ebola vaccine, vaccines used in clinical trials for HIV and SARS-CoV-2, or cancer vaccines.

Lentiviral vectors based on lentivirus, a retrovirus, can modify a cell's nuclear genome to permanently express a gene, although vectors can be modified to prevent integration. Retroviruses were used in 18% of trials before 2018. Libmeldy is an ex vivo stem cell treatment for metachromatic leukodystrophy which uses a lentiviral vector and was authorized by the European medical agency in 2020.

Adeno-associated virus (AAV) is a virus that is incapable of transmission between cells unless the cell is infected by another virus, a helper virus. Adenovirus and the herpes viruses act as helper viruses for AAV. AAV persists within the cell outside of the cell's nuclear genome for an extended period of time through the formation of concatemers mostly organized as episomes. Genetic material from AAV vectors is integrated into the host cell's nuclear genome at a low frequency and likely mediated by the DNA-modifying enzymes of the host cell. Animal models suggest that integration of AAV genetic material into the host cell's nuclear genome may cause hepatocellular carcinoma, a form of liver cancer. Several AAV investigational agents have been explored in treatment of wet age related macular degeneration by both intravitreal and subretinal approaches as a potential application of AAV gene therapy for human disease.

=== Non-viral ===
Non-viral vectors for gene therapy present certain advantages over viral methods, such as large scale production and low host immunogenicity. However, non-viral methods initially produced lower levels of transfection and gene expression, and thus lower therapeutic efficacy. Newer technologies offer promise of solving these problems, with the advent of increased cell-specific targeting and subcellular trafficking control.

Methods for non-viral gene therapy include the injection of naked DNA, electroporation, the gene gun, sonoporation, magnetofection, the use of oligonucleotides, lipoplexes, dendrimers, and inorganic nanoparticles. These therapeutics can be administered directly or through scaffold enrichment.

More recent approaches, such as those performed by companies such as Ligandal, offer the possibility of creating cell-specific targeting technologies for a variety of gene therapy modalities, including RNA, DNA and gene editing tools such as CRISPR. Other companies, such as Arbutus Biopharma and Arcturus Therapeutics, offer non-viral, non-cell-targeted approaches that mainly exhibit liver trophism. In more recent years, startups such as Sixfold Bio, Nanite, GenEdit, and Spotlight Therapeutics have begun to solve the non-viral gene delivery problem. Non-viral techniques offer the possibility of repeat dosing and greater tailorability of genetic payloads, which in the future will be more likely to take over viral-based delivery systems.

Companies such as Editas Medicine, Intellia Therapeutics, CRISPR Therapeutics, Casebia, Cellectis, Precision Biosciences, bluebird bio, Excision BioTherapeutics, and Sangamo have developed non-viral gene editing techniques, however frequently still use viruses for delivering gene insertion material following genomic cleavage by guided nucleases. These companies focus on gene editing, and still face major delivery hurdles.

BioNTech, Moderna Therapeutics and CureVac focus on delivery of mRNA payloads, which are necessarily non-viral delivery problems.

Alnylam, Dicerna Pharmaceuticals, and Ionis Pharmaceuticals focus on delivery of siRNA (antisense oligonucleotides) for gene suppression, which also necessitate non-viral delivery systems.

In academic contexts, a number of laboratories are working on delivery of PEGylated particles, which form serum protein coronas and chiefly exhibit LDL receptor mediated uptake in cells in vivo.

== Treatment ==
=== Cancer ===
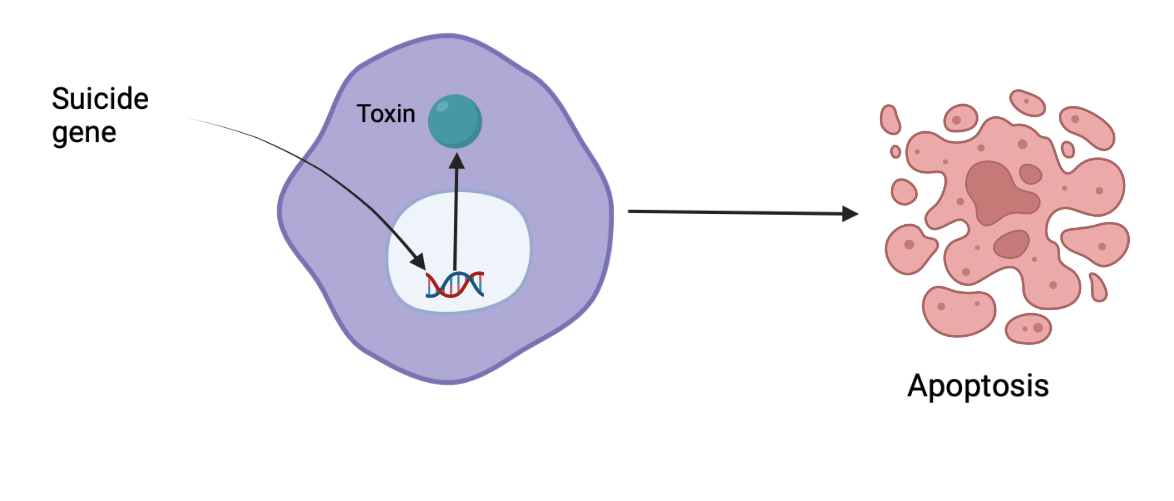
Suicide gene therapy graphic used to treat cancer

There have been attempts to treat cancer using gene therapy. As of 2017, 65% of gene therapy trials were for cancer treatment.

Adenovirus vectors are useful for some cancer gene therapies because adenovirus can transiently insert genetic material into a cell without permanently altering the cell's nuclear genome. These vectors can be used to cause antigens to be added to cancers causing an immune response, or hinder angiogenesis by expressing certain proteins. An Adenovirus vector is used in the commercial products Gendicine and Oncorine. Another commercial product, Rexin G, uses a retrovirus-based vector and selectively binds to receptors that are more expressed in tumors.

One approach, suicide gene therapy, works by introducing genes encoding enzymes that will cause a cancer cell to die. Another approach is the use oncolytic viruses, such as Oncorine, which are viruses that selectively reproduce in cancerous cells leaving other cells unaffected.

mRNA has been suggested as a non-viral vector for cancer gene therapy that would temporarily change a cancerous cell's function to create antigens or kill the cancerous cells and there have been several trials.

Afamitresgene autoleucel, sold under the brand name Tecelra, is an autologous T cell immunotherapy used for the treatment of synovial sarcoma. It is a T cell receptor (TCR) gene therapy. It is the first FDA-approved engineered cell therapy for a solid tumor. It uses a self-inactivating lentiviral vector to express a T-cell receptor specific for MAGE-A4, a melanoma-associated antigen.

=== Genetic diseases ===
Gene therapy approaches to replace a faulty gene with a healthy gene have been proposed and are being studied for treating some genetic diseases. As of 2017, 11.1% of gene therapy clinical trials targeted monogenic diseases.

Diseases such as sickle cell disease that are caused by autosomal recessive disorders for which a person's normal phenotype or cell function may be restored in cells that have the disease by a normal copy of the gene that is mutated, may be a good candidate for gene therapy treatment. The risks and benefits related to gene therapy for sickle cell disease are not known.

Gene therapy has been used in the eye. The eye is especially suitable for adeno-associated virus vectors. Voretigene neparvovec is an approved gene therapy to treat patients with vision impairment due to mutations in the RPE65 gene alipogene tiparvovec, a treatment for familial lipoprotein lipase (LPL) deficiency, and Zolgensma for the treatment of spinal muscular atrophy both use an adeno-associated virus vector.

=== Infectious diseases ===
As of 2017, 7% of genetic therapy trials targeted infectious diseases. 69.2% of trials targeted HIV, 11% hepatitis B or C, and 7.1% malaria.

=== List of gene therapies for treatment of disease ===
Some genetic therapies have been approved by the US Food and Drug Administration (FDA), the European Medicines Agency (EMA), and for use in Russia and China.The development and manufacturing of gene therapy products often relies on specialized contract development and manufacturing organizations (CDMOs) that provide plasmid DNA and viral vector production services for clinical and commercial applications. Companies operating in this field include Aldevron, Cobra Biologics and 3PBIOVIAN.

List of approved gene therapies for the treatment of disease
INN	Brand name	Type	Manufacturer	Target	US Food and Drug Administration (FDA) approved	European Medicines Agency (EMA) authorized
afamitresgene autoleucel	Tecelra	Ex vivo	Adaptimmune	synovial sarcoma	August 2024	
alipogene tiparvovec	Glybera	In vivo	Chiesi Farmaceutici	lipoprotein lipase deficiency		Withdrawn
atidarsagene autotemcel	Libmeldy, Lenmeldy (Arylsulfatase A gene encoding autologous CD34+ cells)	Ex vivo	Orchard Therapeutics	metachromatic leukodystrophy	March 2024	December 2020
autologous CD34+	Strimvelis			adenosine deaminase deficiency (ADA-SCID)		May 2016
axicabtagene ciloleucel	Yescarta	Ex vivo	Kite pharma	large B-cell lymphoma	October 2017	August 2018
beremagene geperpavec	Vyjuvek	In vivo	Krystal Biotech	dystrophic epidermolysis bullosa (DEB)	May 2023	
betibeglogene autotemcel	Zynteglo			beta thalassemia	August 2022	May 2019
brexucabtagene autoleucel	Tecartus	Ex vivo	Kite Pharma	mantle cell lymphoma and acute lymphoblastic leukemia	July 2020	December 2020
cambiogenplasmid	Neovasculgen			vascular endothelial growth factor peripheral artery disease		
delandistrogene moxeparvovec	Elevidys	In vivo	Catalent	Duchenne muscular dystrophy	June 2023	
eladocagene exuparvovec	Kebilidi, Upstaza	In vivo	PTC Therapeutics	aromatic L‑amino acid decarboxylase (AADC) deficiency	November 2024	July 2022
elivaldogene autotemcel	Skysona			cerebral adrenoleukodystrophy		July 2021
exagamglogene autotemcel	Casgevy	Ex vivo	Vertex Pharmaceuticals	sickle cell disease	December 2023	
gendicine				head and neck squamous cell carcinoma		
idecabtagene vicleucel	Abecma	Ex vivo	Celgene	multiple myeloma	March 2021	
lisocabtagene maraleucel	Breyanzi	Ex vivo	Juno Therapeutics	B-cell lymphoma	February 2021	
lovotibeglogene autotemcel	Lyfgenia	Ex vivo	Bluebird Bio	sickle cell disease	December 2023	
marnetegragene autotemcel	Kresladi		Rocket Pharmaceuticals	severe leukocyte adhesion deficiency type I	March 2026	
nadofaragene firadenovec	Adstiladrin		Ferring Pharmaceuticals	high-risk Bacillus Calmette-Guérin (BCG)-unresponsive non-muscle-invasive bladder cancer (NMIBC) with carcinoma in situ (CIS)	Yes	
obecabtagene autoleucel	Aucatzyl		Autolus Therapeutics	acute lymphoblastic leukemia	November 2024	
onasemnogene abeparvovec	Zolgensma	In vivo	Novartis Gene Therapies	spinal muscular atrophy type I	May 2019	March 2020
pariglasgene brecaparvovec	Genglycos			glycogen storage disease type Ia	August 2026	
prademagene zamikeracel	Zevaskyn			recessive dystrophic epidermolysis bullosa	April 2025	
revakinagene taroretcel	Encelto		Neurotech Pharmaceuticals	macular telangiectasia type 2	March 2025	
talimogene laherparepvec	Imlygic	In vivo	Amgen	melanoma	October 2015	December 2015
tisagenlecleucel	Kymriah			B cell lymphoblastic leukemia		August 2018
valoctocogene roxaparvovec	Roctavian		BioMarin International Limited	hemophilia A		August 2022
voretigene neparvovec	Luxturna	In vivo	Spark Therapeutics	biallelic RPE65 mutation associated Leber congenital amaurosis	December 2017	November 2018

== Adverse effects, contraindications and hurdles for use ==
Some of the unsolved problems include:

- Off-target effects – The possibility of unwanted, likely harmful, changes to the genome present a large barrier to the widespread implementation of this technology. Improvements to the specificity of gRNAs and Cas enzymes present viable solutions to this issue as well as the refinement of the delivery method of CRISPR. It is likely that different diseases will benefit from different delivery methods.
- Short-lived nature – Before gene therapy can become a permanent cure for a condition, the therapeutic DNA introduced into target cells must remain functional and the cells containing the therapeutic DNA must be stable. Problems with integrating therapeutic DNA into the nuclear genome and the rapidly dividing nature of many cells prevent it from achieving long-term benefits. Patients require multiple treatments.
- Immune response – Any time a foreign object is introduced into human tissues, the immune system is stimulated to attack the invader. Stimulating the immune system in a way that reduces gene therapy effectiveness is possible. The immune system's enhanced response to viruses that it has seen before reduces the effectiveness to repeated treatments.
- Problems with viral vectors – Viral vectors carry the risks of toxicity, inflammatory responses, and gene control and targeting issues.
- Multigene disorders – Some commonly occurring disorders, such as heart disease, high blood pressure, Alzheimer's disease, arthritis, and diabetes, are affected by variations in multiple genes, which complicate gene therapy.
- Some therapies may breach the Weismann barrier (between soma and germ-line) protecting the testes, potentially modifying the germline, falling afoul of regulations in countries that prohibit the latter practice.
- Insertional mutagenesis – If the DNA is integrated in a sensitive spot in the genome, for example in a tumor suppressor gene, the therapy could induce a tumor. This has occurred in clinical trials for X-linked severe combined immunodeficiency (X-SCID) patients, in which hematopoietic stem cells were transduced with a corrective transgene using a retrovirus, and this led to the development of T cell leukemia in 3 of 20 patients. One possible solution is to add a functional tumor suppressor gene to the DNA to be integrated. This may be problematic since the longer the DNA is, the harder it is to integrate into cell genomes. CRISPR technology allows researchers to make much more precise genome changes at exact locations.
- Cost – alipogene tiparvovec (Glybera), for example, at a cost of $1.6 million per patient, was reported in 2013, to be the world's most expensive drug.

=== Deaths ===
Four patients' deaths have been reported in gene therapy trials, putting the field under close scrutiny. The first was that of Jesse Gelsinger, who died in 1999, because of immune rejection response. One X-SCID patient died of leukemia in 2003. In 2007, a rheumatoid arthritis patient died from an infection; the subsequent investigation concluded that the death was not related to gene therapy.

In 2025, Zilong Qiu and his team at the Shanghai Jiao Tong University School of Medicine, treated a six-year-old girl at Xinhua Hospital in Shanghai for Snijders Blok–Campeau syndrome. It was subsequently discovered that a year before, Qiu used engineered viruses to carry the corrected gene into the spinal fluid. The girl developed a severe immune reaction, thrombotic microangiopathy, caused by the gene therapy and died a week after the treatment.. In August of that same year, a boy in China under experimental treatment for Duchenne muscular dystrophy died as a result of the therapy.

== Regulations ==
Regulations covering genetic modification are part of general guidelines about human-involved biomedical research. There are no international treaties which are legally binding in this area, but there are recommendations for national laws from various bodies.

The Helsinki Declaration (Ethical Principles for Medical Research Involving Human Subjects) was amended by the World Medical Association's General Assembly in 2008. This document provides principles physicians and researchers must consider when involving humans as research subjects. The Statement on Gene Therapy Research initiated by the Human Genome Organization (HUGO) in 2001, provides a legal baseline for all countries. HUGO's document emphasizes human freedom and adherence to human rights, and offers recommendations for somatic gene therapy, including the importance of recognizing public concerns about such research.

=== United States ===
No federal legislation lays out protocols or restrictions about human genetic engineering. This subject is governed by overlapping regulations from local and federal agencies, including the Department of Health and Human Services, the FDA and NIH's Recombinant DNA Advisory Committee. Researchers seeking federal funds for an investigational new drug application, (commonly the case for somatic human genetic engineering,) must obey international and federal guidelines for the protection of human subjects.

NIH serves as the main gene therapy regulator for federally funded research. Privately funded research is advised to follow these regulations. NIH provides funding for research that develops or enhances genetic engineering techniques and to evaluate the ethics and quality in current research. The NIH maintains a mandatory registry of human genetic engineering research protocols that includes all federally funded projects.

An NIH advisory committee published a set of guidelines on gene manipulation. The guidelines discuss lab safety as well as human test subjects and various experimental types that involve genetic changes. Several sections specifically pertain to human genetic engineering, including Section III-C-1. This section describes required review processes and other aspects when seeking approval to begin clinical research involving genetic transfer into a human patient. The protocol for a gene therapy clinical trial must be approved by the NIH's Recombinant DNA Advisory Committee prior to any clinical trial beginning; this is different from any other kind of clinical trial.

As with other kinds of drugs, the FDA regulates the quality and safety of gene therapy products and supervises how these products are used clinically. Therapeutic alteration of the human genome falls under the same regulatory requirements as any other medical treatment. Research involving human subjects, such as clinical trials, must be reviewed and approved by the FDA and an Institutional Review Board.

== Gene doping ==
Athletes may adopt gene therapy technologies to improve their performance. Gene doping is not known to occur, but multiple gene therapies may have such effects. Kayser et al. argue that gene doping could level the playing field if all athletes receive equal access. Critics claim that any therapeutic intervention for non-therapeutic/enhancement purposes compromises the ethical foundations of medicine and sports.

== Genetic enhancement ==
Genetic engineering could be used to cure diseases, but also to change physical appearance, metabolism, and even improve physical capabilities and mental faculties such as memory and intelligence. Ethical claims about germline engineering include beliefs that every fetus has a right to remain genetically unmodified, that parents hold the right to genetically modify their offspring, and that every child has the right to be born free of preventable diseases. For parents, genetic engineering could be seen as another child enhancement technique to add to diet, exercise, education, training, cosmetics, and plastic surgery. Another theorist claims that moral concerns limit but do not prohibit germline engineering.

A 2020 issue of the journal Bioethics was devoted to moral issues surrounding germline genetic engineering in people.

Possible regulatory schemes include a complete ban, provision to everyone, or professional self-regulation. The American Medical Association's Council on Ethical and Judicial Affairs stated that "genetic interventions to enhance traits should be considered permissible only in severely restricted situations: (1) clear and meaningful benefits to the fetus or child; (2) no trade-off with other characteristics or traits; and (3) equal access to the genetic technology, irrespective of income or other socioeconomic characteristics."

As early in the history of biotechnology as 1990, there have been scientists opposed to attempts to modify the human germline using these new tools, and such concerns have continued as technology progressed. With the advent of new techniques like CRISPR, in March 2015 a group of scientists urged a worldwide moratorium on clinical use of gene editing technologies to edit the human genome in a way that can be inherited. In April 2015, researchers sparked controversy when they reported results of basic research to edit the DNA of non-viable human embryos using CRISPR. A committee of the American National Academy of Sciences and National Academy of Medicine gave qualified support to human genome editing in 2017 once answers have been found to safety and efficiency problems "but only for serious conditions under stringent oversight."

== History ==
=== 1970s and earlier ===
In 1972, Friedmann and Roblin authored a paper in Science titled "Gene therapy for human genetic disease?". Rogers (1970) was cited for proposing that exogenous good DNA be used to replace the defective DNA in those with genetic defects.

=== 1980s ===
In 1984, a retrovirus vector system was designed that could efficiently insert foreign genes into mammalian chromosomes.

=== 1990s ===
The first approved gene therapy clinical research in the US took place in September 1990, at the National Institutes of Health (NIH), under the direction of William French Anderson. Four-year-old Ashanti DeSilva received treatment for a genetic defect that left her with adenosine deaminase deficiency (ADA-SCID), a severe immune system deficiency. The defective gene of the patient's blood cells was replaced by the functional variant. Ashanti's immune system was partially restored by the therapy. Production of the missing enzyme was temporarily stimulated, but the new cells with functional genes were not generated. She led a normal life only with the regular injections performed every two months. The effects were successful, but temporary.

Cancer gene therapy was introduced in 1992/93 (Trojan et al. 1993). The treatment of glioblastoma multiforme, the malignant brain tumor whose outcome is always fatal, was done using a vector expressing antisense IGF-I RNA (clinical trial approved by NIH protocol no.1602 24 November 1993, and by the FDA in 1994). This therapy also represents the beginning of cancer immunogene therapy, a treatment which proves to be effective due to the anti-tumor mechanism of IGF-I antisense, which is related to strong immune and apoptotic phenomena.

In 1992, Claudio Bordignon, working at the Vita-Salute San Raffaele University, performed the first gene therapy procedure using hematopoietic stem cells as vectors to deliver genes intended to correct hereditary diseases. In 2002, this work led to the publication of the first successful gene therapy treatment for ADA-SCID. The success of a multi-center trial for treating children with SCID (severe combined immune deficiency or "bubble boy" disease) from 2000 and 2002, was questioned when two of the ten children treated at the trial's Paris center developed a leukemia-like condition. Clinical trials were halted temporarily in 2002, but resumed after regulatory review of the protocol in the US, the United Kingdom, France, Italy, and Germany.

In 1993, Andrew Gobea was born with SCID following prenatal genetic screening. Blood was removed from his mother's placenta and umbilical cord immediately after birth, to acquire stem cells. The allele that codes for adenosine deaminase (ADA) was obtained and inserted into a retrovirus. Retroviruses and stem cells were mixed, after which the viruses inserted the gene into the stem cell chromosomes. Stem cells containing the working ADA gene were injected into Andrew's blood. Injections of the ADA enzyme were also given weekly. For four years T cells (white blood cells), produced by stem cells, made ADA enzymes using the ADA gene. After four years more treatment was needed.

In 1996, Luigi Naldini and Didier Trono developed a new class of gene therapy vectors based on HIV capable of infecting non-dividing cells that have since then been widely used in clinical and research settings, pioneering lentivirals vector in gene therapy.

Jesse Gelsinger's death in 1999 impeded gene therapy research in the US. As a result, the FDA suspended several clinical trials pending the reevaluation of ethical and procedural practices.

=== 2000s ===
The modified gene therapy strategy of antisense IGF-I RNA (NIH n˚ 1602) using antisense / triple helix anti-IGF-I approach was registered in 2002, by Wiley gene therapy clinical trial - n˚ 635 and 636. The approach has shown promising results in the treatment of six different malignant tumors: glioblastoma, cancers of liver, colon, prostate, uterus, and ovary (Collaborative NATO Science Programme on Gene Therapy USA, France, Poland n˚ LST 980517 conducted by J. Trojan) (Trojan et al., 2012). This anti-gene antisense/triple helix therapy has proven to be efficient, due to the mechanism stopping simultaneously IGF-I expression on translation and transcription levels, strengthening anti-tumor immune and apoptotic phenomena.

==== 2002 ====
Sickle cell disease can be treated in mice. The mice – which have essentially the same defect that causes human cases – used a viral vector to induce production of fetal hemoglobin (HbF), which normally ceases to be produced shortly after birth. In humans, the use of hydroxyurea to stimulate the production of HbF temporarily alleviates sickle cell symptoms. The researchers demonstrated this treatment to be a more permanent means to increase therapeutic HbF production.

A new gene therapy approach repaired errors in messenger RNA derived from defective genes. This technique has the potential to treat thalassaemia, cystic fibrosis and some cancers.

Researchers created liposomes 25 nanometers across that can carry therapeutic DNA through pores in the nuclear membrane.

==== 2003 ====
In 2003, a research team inserted genes into the brain for the first time. They used liposomes coated in a polymer called polyethylene glycol, which unlike viral vectors, are small enough to cross the blood–brain barrier.

Short pieces of double-stranded RNA (short, interfering RNAs or siRNAs) are used by cells to degrade RNA of a particular sequence. If a siRNA is designed to match the RNA copied from a faulty gene, then the abnormal protein product of that gene will not be produced.

Gendicine is a cancer gene therapy that delivers the tumor suppressor gene p53 using an engineered adenovirus. In 2003, it was approved in China for the treatment of head and neck squamous cell carcinoma.

==== 2006 ====
In March, researchers announced the successful use of gene therapy to treat two adult patients for X-linked chronic granulomatous disease, a disease which affects myeloid cells and damages the immune system. The study is the first to show that gene therapy can treat the myeloid system.

In May, a team reported a way to prevent the immune system from rejecting a newly delivered gene. Similar to organ transplantation, gene therapy has been plagued by this problem. The immune system normally recognizes the new gene as foreign and rejects the cells carrying it. The research utilized a newly uncovered network of genes regulated by molecules known as microRNAs. This natural function selectively obscured their therapeutic gene in immune system cells and protected it from discovery. Mice infected with the gene containing an immune-cell microRNA target sequence did not reject the gene.

In August, scientists successfully treated metastatic melanoma in two patients using killer T cells genetically retargeted to attack the cancer cells.

In November, researchers reported on the use of VRX496, a gene-based immunotherapy for the treatment of HIV that uses a lentiviral vector to deliver an antisense gene against the HIV envelope. In a phase I clinical trial, five subjects with chronic HIV infection who had failed to respond to at least two antiretroviral regimens were treated. A single intravenous infusion of autologous CD4 T cells genetically modified with VRX496 was well tolerated. All patients had stable or decreased viral load; four of the five patients had stable or increased CD4 T cell counts. All five patients had stable or increased immune response to HIV antigens and other pathogens. This was the first evaluation of a lentiviral vector administered in a US human clinical trial.

==== 2007 ====
In May 2007, researchers announced the first gene therapy trial for inherited retinal disease. The first operation was carried out on a 23-year-old British male, Robert Johnson, in early 2007.

==== 2008 ====
Leber's congenital amaurosis is an inherited blinding disease caused by mutations in the RPE65 gene. The results of a small clinical trial in children were published in April. Delivery of recombinant adeno-associated virus (AAV) carrying RPE65 yielded positive results. In May, two more groups reported positive results in independent clinical trials using gene therapy to treat the condition. In all three clinical trials, patients recovered functional vision without apparent side-effects.

==== 2009 ====
In September researchers were able to give trichromatic vision to squirrel monkeys. In November 2009, researchers halted a fatal genetic disorder called adrenoleukodystrophy in two children using a lentivirus vector to deliver a functioning version of ABCD1, the gene that is mutated in the disorder.

=== 2010s ===
==== 2010 ====
An April paper reported that gene therapy addressed achromatopsia (color blindness) in dogs by targeting cone photoreceptors. Cone function and day vision were restored for at least 33 months in two young specimens. The therapy was less efficient for older dogs.

In September it was announced that an 18-year-old male patient in France with beta thalassemia major had been successfully treated. Beta thalassemia major is an inherited blood disease in which beta haemoglobin is missing and patients are dependent on regular lifelong blood transfusions. The technique used a lentiviral vector to transduce the human β-globin gene into purified blood and marrow cells obtained from the patient in June 2007. The patient's haemoglobin levels were stable at 9 to 10 g/dL. About a third of the hemoglobin contained the form introduced by the viral vector and blood transfusions were not needed. Further clinical trials were planned. Bone marrow transplants are the only cure for thalassemia, but 75% of patients do not find a matching donor.

Cancer immunogene therapy using modified antigene, antisense/triple helix approach was introduced in South America in 2010/11 in La Sabana University, Bogota (Ethical Committee 14 December 2010, no P-004-10). Considering the ethical aspect of gene diagnostic and gene therapy targeting IGF-I, the IGF-I expressing tumors i.e. lung and epidermis cancers were treated (Trojan et al. 2016).

==== 2011 ====
In 2007 and 2008, a man (Timothy Ray Brown) was cured of HIV by repeated hematopoietic stem cell transplantation (see also allogeneic stem cell transplantation, allogeneic bone marrow transplantation, allotransplantation) with double-delta-32 mutation which disables the CCR5 receptor. This cure was accepted by the medical community in 2011. It required complete ablation of existing bone marrow, which is very debilitating.

In August two of three subjects of a pilot study were confirmed to have been cured from chronic lymphocytic leukemia (CLL). The therapy used genetically modified T cells to attack cells that expressed the CD19 protein to fight the disease. In 2013, the researchers announced that 26 of 59 patients had achieved complete remission and the original patient had remained tumor-free.

Human HGF plasmid DNA therapy of cardiomyocytes is being examined as a potential treatment for coronary artery disease as well as treatment for the damage that occurs to the heart after myocardial infarction.

In 2011, Neovasculgen was registered in Russia as the first-in-class gene-therapy drug for treatment of peripheral artery disease, including critical limb ischemia; it delivers the gene encoding for VEGF. Neovasculogen is a plasmid encoding the CMV promoter and the 165 amino acid form of VEGF.

==== 2012 ====
The FDA approved Phase I clinical trials on thalassemia major patients in the US for 10 participants in July. The study was expected to continue until 2015.

In July 2012, the European Medicines Agency recommended approval of a gene therapy treatment for the first time in either Europe or the United States. The treatment used Alipogene tiparvovec (Glybera) to compensate for lipoprotein lipase deficiency, which can cause severe pancreatitis. The recommendation was endorsed by the European Commission in November 2012, and commercial rollout began in late 2014. Alipogene tiparvovec was expected to cost around $1.6 million per treatment in 2012, revised to $1 million in 2015, making it the most expensive medicine in the world at the time. As of 2016, only the patients treated in clinical trials and a patient who paid the full price for treatment have received the drug.

In December 2012, it was reported that 10 of 13 patients with multiple myeloma were in remission "or very close to it" three months after being injected with a treatment involving genetically engineered T cells to target proteins NY-ESO-1 and LAGE-1, which exist only on cancerous myeloma cells.

==== 2013 ====
In March researchers reported that three of five adult subjects who had acute lymphocytic leukemia (ALL) had been in remission for five months to two years after being treated with genetically modified T cells which attacked cells with CD19 genes on their surface, i.e. all B cells, cancerous or not. The researchers believed that the patients' immune systems would make normal T cells and B cells after a couple of months. They were also given bone marrow. One patient relapsed and died and one died of a blood clot unrelated to the disease.

Following encouraging Phase I trials, in April, researchers announced they were starting Phase II clinical trials (called CUPID2 and SERCA-LVAD) on 250 patients at several hospitals to combat heart disease. The therapy was designed to increase the levels of SERCA2, a protein in heart muscles, improving muscle function. The U.S. Food and Drug Administration (FDA) granted this a breakthrough therapy designation to accelerate the trial and approval process. In 2016, it was reported that no improvement was found from the CUPID 2 trial.

In July researchers reported promising results for six children with two severe hereditary diseases had been treated with a partially deactivated lentivirus to replace a faulty gene and after 7–32 months. Three of the children had metachromatic leukodystrophy, which causes children to lose cognitive and motor skills. The other children had Wiskott–Aldrich syndrome, which leaves them to open to infection, autoimmune diseases, and cancer. Follow up trials with gene therapy on another six children with Wiskott–Aldrich syndrome were also reported as promising.

In October researchers reported that two children born with adenosine deaminase severe combined immunodeficiency disease (ADA-SCID) had been treated with genetically engineered stem cells 18 months previously and that their immune systems were showing signs of full recovery. Another three children were making progress. In 2014, a further 18 children with ADA-SCID were cured by gene therapy. ADA-SCID children have no functioning immune system and are sometimes known as "bubble children".

Also in October researchers reported that they had treated six people with haemophilia in early 2011 using an adeno-associated virus. Over two years later all six were producing clotting factor.

==== 2014 ====
In January researchers reported that six choroideremia patients had been treated with adeno-associated virus with a copy of REP1. Over a six-month to two-year period all had improved their sight. By 2016, 32 patients had been treated with positive results and researchers were hopeful the treatment would be long-lasting. Choroideremia is an inherited genetic eye disease with no approved treatment, leading to loss of sight.

In March researchers reported that 12 HIV patients had been treated since 2009 in a trial with a genetically engineered virus with a rare mutation (CCR5 deficiency) known to protect against HIV with promising results.

Clinical trials of gene therapy for sickle cell disease were started in 2014.

In February LentiGlobin BB305, a gene therapy treatment undergoing clinical trials for treatment of beta thalassemia gained FDA "breakthrough" status after several patients were able to forgo the frequent blood transfusions usually required to treat the disease.

In March researchers delivered a recombinant gene encoding a broadly neutralizing antibody into monkeys infected with simian HIV; the monkeys' cells produced the antibody, which cleared them of HIV. The technique is named immunoprophylaxis by gene transfer (IGT). Animal tests for antibodies to ebola, malaria, influenza, and hepatitis were underway.

In March, scientists, including an inventor of CRISPR, Jennifer Doudna, urged a worldwide moratorium on germline gene therapy, writing "scientists should avoid even attempting, in lax jurisdictions, germline genome modification for clinical application in humans" until the full implications "are discussed among scientific and governmental organizations".

In December, scientists of major world academies called for a moratorium on inheritable human genome edits, including those related to CRISPR-Cas9 technologies but that basic research including embryo gene editing should continue.

==== 2015 ====
Researchers successfully treated a boy with epidermolysis bullosa using skin grafts grown from his own skin cells, genetically altered to repair the mutation that caused his disease.

In November, researchers announced that they had treated a baby girl, Layla Richards, with an experimental treatment using donor T cells genetically engineered using TALEN to attack cancer cells. One year after the treatment she was still free of her cancer (a highly aggressive form of acute lymphoblastic leukaemia [ALL]). Children with highly aggressive ALL normally have a very poor prognosis and Layla's disease had been regarded as terminal before the treatment.

==== 2016 ====
In April the Committee for Medicinal Products for Human Use of the European Medicines Agency endorsed a gene therapy treatment called Strimvelis and the European Commission approved it in June. This treats children born with adenosine deaminase deficiency and who have no functioning immune system. This was the second gene therapy treatment to be approved in Europe.

In October, Chinese scientists reported they had started a trial to genetically modify T cells from 10 adult patients with lung cancer and reinject the modified T cells back into their bodies to attack the cancer cells. The T cells had the PD-1 protein (which stops or slows the immune response) removed using CRISPR-Cas9.

A 2016 Cochrane systematic review looking at data from four trials on topical cystic fibrosis transmembrane conductance regulator (CFTR) gene therapy does not support its clinical use as a mist inhaled into the lungs to treat cystic fibrosis patients with lung infections. One of the four trials did find weak evidence that liposome-based CFTR gene transfer therapy may lead to a small respiratory improvement for people with CF. This weak evidence is not enough to make a clinical recommendation for routine CFTR gene therapy.

==== 2017 ====
In February Kite Pharma announced results from a clinical trial of CAR-T cells in around a hundred people with advanced non-Hodgkin lymphoma.

In March, French scientists reported on clinical research of gene therapy to treat sickle cell disease.

In August, the FDA approved tisagenlecleucel for acute lymphoblastic leukemia. Tisagenlecleucel is an adoptive cell transfer therapy for B-cell acute lymphoblastic leukemia; T cells from a person with cancer are removed, genetically engineered to make a specific T-cell receptor (a chimeric T cell receptor, or "CAR-T") that reacts to the cancer, and are administered back to the person. The T cells are engineered to target a protein called CD19 that is common on B cells. This is the first form of gene therapy to be approved in the United States. In October, a similar therapy called axicabtagene ciloleucel was approved for non-Hodgkin lymphoma.

In October, biophysicist and biohacker Josiah Zayner claimed to have performed the very first in-vivo human genome editing in the form of a self-administered therapy.

On 13 November, medical scientists working with Sangamo Therapeutics, headquartered in Richmond, California, announced the first ever in-body human gene editing therapy. The treatment, designed to permanently insert a healthy version of the flawed gene that causes Hunter syndrome, was given to 44-year-old Brian Madeux and is part of the world's first study to permanently edit DNA inside the human body. The success of the gene insertion was later confirmed. Clinical trials by Sangamo involving gene editing using zinc finger nuclease (ZFN) are ongoing.

In December the results of using an adeno-associated virus with blood clotting factor VIII to treat nine haemophilia A patients were published. Six of the seven patients on the high dose regime increased the level of the blood clotting VIII to normal levels. The low and medium dose regimes had no effect on the patient's blood clotting levels.

In December, the FDA approved voretigene neparvovec, the first in vivo gene therapy, for the treatment of blindness due to Leber's congenital amaurosis. The price of this treatment is US$850,000 for both eyes.

==== 2019 ====
In May, the FDA approved onasemnogene abeparvovec (Zolgensma) for treating spinal muscular atrophy in children under two years of age. The list price of Zolgensma was set at US$2.125 million per dose, making it the most expensive drug ever.

In May, the EMA approved betibeglogene autotemcel (Zynteglo) for treating beta thalassemia for people twelve years of age and older.

In July, Allergan and Editas Medicine announced phase I/II clinical trial of AGN-151587 for the treatment of Leber congenital amaurosis 10. This is one of the first studies of a CRISPR-based in vivo human gene editing therapy, where the editing takes place inside the human body. The first injection of the CRISPR-Cas System was confirmed in March 2020.

Exagamglogene autotemcel, a CRISPR-based human gene editing therapy, was used for sickle cell and thalassemia in clinical trials.

=== 2020s ===
==== 2020 ====
In May, onasemnogene abeparvovec (Zolgensma) was approved by the European Union for the treatment of spinal muscular atrophy in people who either have clinical symptoms of SMA type 1 or who have no more than three copies of the SMN2 gene, irrespective of body weight or age.

In August, Audentes Therapeutics reported that three out of 17 children with X-linked myotubular myopathy participating the clinical trial of a AAV8-based gene therapy treatment AT132 have died. It was suggested that the treatment, whose dosage is based on body weight, exerts a disproportionately toxic effect on heavier patients, since the three patients who died were heavier than the others. The trial has been put on clinical hold.

On 15 October, the Committee for Medicinal Products for Human Use (CHMP) of the European Medicines Agency (EMA) adopted a positive opinion, recommending the granting of a marketing authorisation for the medicinal product Libmeldy (autologous CD34+ cell enriched population that contains hematopoietic stem and progenitor cells transduced ex vivo using a lentiviral vector encoding the human arylsulfatase A gene), a gene therapy for the treatment of children with the "late infantile" (LI) or "early juvenile" (EJ) forms of metachromatic leukodystrophy (MLD). The active substance of Libmeldy consists of the child's own stem cells which have been modified to contain working copies of the ARSA gene. When the modified cells are injected back into the patient as a one-time infusion, the cells are expected to start producing the ARSA enzyme that breaks down the build-up of sulfatides in the nerve cells and other cells of the patient's body. Libmeldy was approved for medical use in the EU in December 2020.

On 15 October, Lysogene, a French biotechnological company, reported the death of a patient in who has received LYS-SAF302, an experimental gene therapy treatment for mucopolysaccharidosis type IIIA (Sanfilippo syndrome type A).

==== 2021 ====
In May, a new method using an altered version of HIV as a lentivirus vector was reported in the treatment of 50 children with ADA-SCID obtaining positive results in 48 of them, this method is expected to be safer than retroviruses vectors commonly used in previous studies of SCID where the development of leukemia was usually observed and had already been used in 2019, but in a smaller group with X-SCID.

In June a clinical trial on six patients affected with transthyretin amyloidosis reported a reduction the concentration of missfolded transthretin (TTR) protein in serum through CRISPR-based inactivation of the TTR gene in liver cells observing mean reductions of 52% and 87% among the lower and higher dose groups.This was done in vivo without taking cells out of the patient to edit them and reinfuse them later.

In July results of a small gene therapy phase I study was published reporting observation of dopamine restoration on seven patients between 4 and 9 years old affected by aromatic L-amino acid decarboxylase deficiency (AADC deficiency).

==== 2022 ====
In February, the first ever gene therapy for Tay–Sachs disease was announced, it uses an adeno-associated virus to deliver the correct instruction for the HEXA gene on brain cells which causes the disease. Only two children were part of a compassionate trial presenting improvements over the natural course of the disease and no vector-related adverse events.

In May, eladocagene exuparvovec is recommended for approval by the European Commission.

In July results of a gene therapy candidate for haemophilia B called FLT180 were announced, it works using an adeno-associated virus (AAV) to restore the clotting factor IX (FIX) protein, normal levels of the protein were observed with low doses of the therapy but immunosuppression was necessitated to decrease the risk of vector-related immune responses.

In December, a 13-year girl that had been diagnosed with T-cell acute lymphoblastic leukaemia was successfully treated at Great Ormond Street Hospital (GOSH) in the first documented use of therapeutic gene editing for this purpose, after undergoing six months of an experimental treatment, where all attempts of other treatments failed. The procedure included reprogramming a healthy T-cell to destroy the cancerous T-cells to first rid her of leukaemia, and then rebuilding her immune system using healthy immune cells. The GOSH team used BASE editing and had previously treated a case of acute lymphoblastic leukaemia in 2015 using TALENs.

==== 2023 ====
In May 2023, the FDA approved beremagene geperpavec for the treatment of wounds in people with dystrophic epidermolysis bullosa (DEB) which is applied as a topical gel that delivers a herpes-simplex virus type 1 (HSV-1) vector encoding the collagen type VII alpha 1 chain (COL7A1) gene that is dysfunctional on those affected by DEB . One trial found 65% of the Vyjuvek-treated wounds completely closed while only 26% of the placebo-treated at 24 weeks. It has been also reported its use as an eyedrop for a patient with DEB that had vision loss due to the widespread blistering with good results.

In June 2023, the FDA gave an accelerated approval to Elevidys for Duchenne muscular dystrophy (DMD) only for boys 4 to 5 years old as they are more likely to benefit from the therapy which consists of one-time intravenous infusion of a virus (AAV rh74 vector) that delivers a functioning "microdystrophin" gene (138 kDa) into the muscle cells to act in place of the normal dystrophin (427 kDa) that is found mutated in this disease.

In July 2023, it was reported that it had been developed a new method to affect genetic expressions through direct current.

In December 2023, two gene therapies were approved for sickle cell disease, exagamglogene autotemcel and lovotibeglogene autotemcel.

2024

In November 2024, FDA granted accelerated approval for eladocagene exuparvovec-tneq (Kebilidi, PTC Therapeutics), a direct-to-brain gene therapy for aromatic L-amino acid decarboxylase deficiency. It uses a recombinant adeno-associated virus serotype 2 (rAAV2) to deliver a functioning DOPA decarboxylase (DDC) gene directly into the putamen, increasing the AADC enzyme and restoring dopamine production. It is administered through a stereotactic surgical procedure.

== List of gene therapies ==
- Gene therapy for color blindness
- Gene therapy for epilepsy
- Gene therapy for osteoarthritis
- Gene therapy in Parkinson's disease
- Gene therapy of the human retina
- List of gene therapies

== See also ==
- Molecular oncology
