= Claudio Bordignon =

Italian geneticist (died 2026)

Claudio Bordignon (died 31 March 2026) was an Italian geneticist.

== Life and career ==
In 1992, Bordignon, working at the Vita-Salute San Raffaele University, Milan, Italy performed the first procedure of gene therapy using hematopoietic stem cells as vectors to deliver genes intended to correct hereditary diseases. This was a world first, but was unfortunately unsuccessful because it did not lead to sustained correction of the hematopoietic stem cells. In 2002, this work led to the publication of the first successful gene therapy treatment for adenosine deaminase deficiency (SCID). He expanded this work to stem cell gene therapy of other genetic diseases and AIDS, and for the immunotherapy of cancer.

In 2005, he was nominated by the European Commission as one of the 22 founding members of the European Research Council (ERC).

Bordignon was the first President of the European Working Group on Human Gene Transfer and Therapy (EWGT), now known as the European Society of Gene and Cell Therapy (ESGCT). In 2010, he was awarded the ESGCT Outstanding Achievement Award, along with Alessandro Aiuti and Maria Grazia Roncarlo in recognition of their contributions to the field.

He graduated in medicine from the University of Milan, where he specialised in Internal Medicine and in Hematology.

Bordignon died on 31 March 2026.

== Sources ==
- Gene therapy. Italians first to use stem cells. Abbott A. Nature. 9 April 1992;356(6369):465.
- Patent: 20080286305 Antigen Transduced T Cells Used as a Delivery System for Antigens 11-20-2008
- Dr Bordignon's Page at The European Research council
