= Atidarsagene autotemcel =

Gene therapy for leukodystrophy

Clinical data
- Trade names: Libmeldy, Lenmeldy
- Other names: OTL-200
- AHFS/Drugs.com: Monograph
- License data: US DailyMed: Atidarsagene autotemcel
- Routes of administration: Intravenous infusion
- ATC code: A16AB21 (WHO)

Legal status
- Legal status: UK: POM (Prescription only); US: ℞-only; EU: Rx-only

Identifiers
- UNII: EPP8G99QG4
- KEGG: D12877

Atidarsagene autotemcel, sold under the brand name Libmeldy among others, is a gene therapy treatment for metachromatic leukodystrophy developed by Orchard Therapeutics. It contains an autologous CD34⁺ cell enriched population that contains haematopoietic stem and progenitor cells transduced using a lentiviral vector encoding the human arylsulfatase A (ARSA) gene.

The most common side effects include fever and low white blood cell count, mouth sores, respiratory infections, rash, medical line infections, viral infections, fever, gastrointestinal infections and enlarged liver.

Atidarsagene autotemcel was authorized for medical use in the European Union in December 2020, in the United Kingdom in February 2021, and in the United States in March 2024. It is the first gene therapy approved by the US Food and Drug Administration (FDA) for the treatment of metachromatic leukodystrophy.

== Medical uses ==
Atidarsagene autotemcel is indicated for the treatment of metachromatic leukodystrophy characterized by biallelic mutations in the arysulfatase A (ARSA) gene leading to a reduction of the ARSA enzymatic activity in children with late infantile or early juvenile forms, without clinical manifestations of the disease; and in children with the early juvenile form, with early clinical manifestations of the disease, who still have the ability to walk independently and before the onset of cognitive decline.

In the US, atidarsagene autotemcel is indicated for the treatment of children with pre-symptomatic late infantile, pre-symptomatic early juvenile or early symptomatic early juvenile metachromatic leukodystrophy.

Atidarsagene autotemcel is a one-time, individualized single-dose infusion made from the recipient's own hematopoietic (blood) stem cells, which have been genetically modified to include functional copies of the ARSA gene. The stem cells are collected from the recipient and modified by adding a functional copy of the ARSA gene. The modified stem cells are transplanted back into the recipient where they engraft (attach and multiply) within the bone marrow. The modified stem cells supply the body with myeloid (immune) cells that produce the ARSA enzyme, which helps break down the harmful build-up of sulfatides and may stop the progression of MLD. Prior to treatment, recipients must undergo high-dose chemotherapy, a process that removes cells from the bone marrow so they can be replaced with the modified cells in atidarsagene autotemcel.

== History ==
The FDA assessed the safety and effectiveness of atidarsagene autotemcel based on data from 37 children who received atidarsagene autotemcel in two single-arm, open-label clinical trials and in an expanded access program. Children who received treatment with atidarsagene autotemcel were compared to untreated children (natural history). The primary efficacy endpoint was severe motor impairment-free survival, defined as the interval from birth to the first occurrence of loss of locomotion and loss of sitting without support or death. In children with metachromatic leukodystrophy, treatment with atidarsagene autotemcel significantly reduced the risk of severe motor impairment or death compared with untreated children. All children with pre-symptomatic late infantile metachromatic leukodystrophy who were treated with atidarsagene autotemcel were alive at six years of age, compared to only 58% of children in the natural history group. At five years of age, 71% of treated children were able to walk without assistance. 85% of the children treated had normal language and performance IQ scores, which has not been reported in untreated children. In addition, children with pre-symptomatic early juvenile and early symptomatic early juvenile metachromatic leukodystrophy showed slowing of motor and/or cognitive disease.

The FDA granted the application for atidarsagene autotemcel priority review, orphan drug, rare pediatric disease, and regenerative medicine advanced therapy designations. The FDA granted approval of Lenmeldy to Orchard Therapeutics.

== Society and culture ==
=== Legal status ===
Atidarsagene autotemcel was authorized for medical use in the EU in December 2020, in the UK in February 2021, and approved in the US in March 2024.

=== Economics ===
The reported price of Lenmeldy in the US in 2025 is $4.25 million for a single dose.

In February 2022, it was announced that NHS England would be providing the drug to metachromatic leukodystrophy patients, after negotiating a discount with the manufacturer. The assessment by BeneluxA concluded that it should only be reimbursed if the company offered a significant price reduction. The National Centre for Pharmacoeconomics (NCPE) in Ireland recommends "that atidarsagene autotemcel not be considered for reimbursement unless cost effectiveness can be improved relative to existing treatment."
