= William French Anderson =

American physician, geneticist and molecular biologist

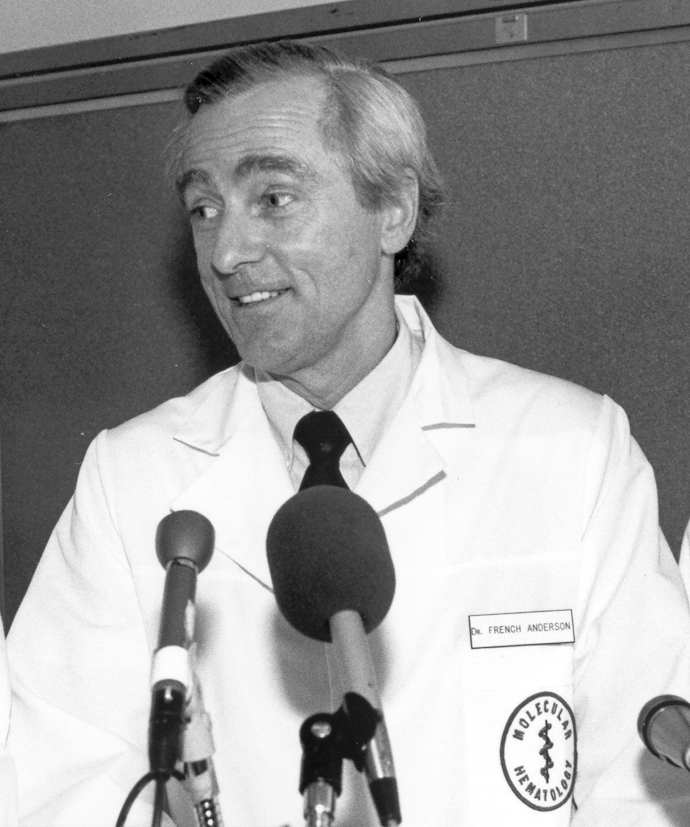
- Dr. Anderson in 1990
- Born: December 31, 1936 (age 89); Tulsa, Oklahoma, U.S.
- Education: Harvard College; Trinity College, Cambridge; Harvard Medical School
- Known for: Contributions to gene therapy
- Scientific career
- Fields: Genetics molecular biology
- Criminal information
- Convictions: Lewd acts upon a child under the age of 14 (three counts); Continuous sexual abuse (one count)
- Penalty: 14 years imprisonment

William French Anderson (born December 31, 1936) is an American physician, geneticist and molecular biologist. He is known as the "father of gene therapy". He graduated from Harvard College in 1958, Trinity College, Cambridge in 1960, and from Harvard Medical School in 1963. In 1990 he was the first person to succeed in carrying out gene therapy by treating a 4-year-old girl suffering from severe combined immunodeficiency (a disorder called "bubble boy disease").

== Early life and education ==
Anderson was born in Tulsa, Oklahoma to his two parents. His father was a civil engineer, his mother was a journalist and writer, and he had two older sisters. He had a very happy childhood. He was recognized in high school for his scholarship, interest in science, and prowess on the track team. He won an Honorable Mention in the Westinghouse Science Talent Search for a project demonstrating how Roman numerals could be used in arithmetical procedures. He graduated in 1954 from Tulsa Central High School.

Anderson went to Harvard College, where he published several papers as an undergraduate: his high school work on Roman numerals in classical philology in 1956, arithmetical operations using Minoan linear B numerals in the American Journal of Archaeology in 1958, a physical chemistry research paper in the Journal of the American Chemical Society in 1958, and a research study on the effects of irradiation on DNA in the Journal of Cellular and Comparative Physiology in 1961. In its March 19, 1956 issue, Time magazine called Anderson a "Harvard Prodigy" for his research work on ancient numerical systems. He graduated from Harvard in 1958, and spent two years at Trinity College, Cambridge University (England), where he obtained an M.A., worked in the laboratory of Francis Crick, won a Full Blue on the track team, and met, and in 1961 married Kathy, who was a fellow medical student at Cambridge.

He returned to Harvard, to the medical school, and was joined there by Kathy a year later. Anderson graduated in 1963 and spent a year internship in pediatric medicine at Children's Hospital in Boston. His wife graduated in 1964 and went on to have a very distinguished career in pediatric surgery. Anderson, after his intern year, spent a year conducting bacterial genetics research at Harvard Medical School and published his work in the Proceedings of the National Academy of Sciences USA in 1965.

== Career ==
Anderson then spent two years, 1965–1967, under the tutelage of Marshall Nirenberg in a laboratory at the National Institutes of Health, where he helped finish the decipherment of the genetic code. Nirenberg rewarded his efforts by allowing him to make the first public presentation of the final genetic code before an audience of approximately 2,000 scientists at the April 1966 meeting of FASEB in Atlantic City. After his successful post-doctoral fellowship with Nirenberg, Anderson was given his own laboratory in the NIH in July 1967. He made clear from the beginning that his goal was to develop a way to give a normal gene to children with a genetic defect in order to cure the genetic disease. He, therefore, decided to begin by studying human disease on the molecular level. Over his career, he has published more than 400 research papers, 39 editorials, and 5 books, and has received numerous awards and honors including 5 honorary doctorate degrees.

=== Discovery of eukaryotic protein synthesis initiation factors ===
As Anderson began his own career, protein synthesis in bacteria was at the forefront of molecular biology research. He set out to discover protein synthesis initiation factors in mammals. His first major accomplishment, in 1970, was the isolation from rabbit reticulocytes (immature red blood cells) of several factors that initiated hemoglobin synthesis on reticulocyte ribosomes. It was later learned that these factors also initiated protein synthesis in essentially all eukaryotic systems.

=== Development of a cell-free protein synthesizing system ===
In order to isolate the predicted molecule "messenger RNA", a cell-free protein synthesizing system of mRNA-free ribosomes was needed. Initially, a cell-free tRNA-dependent protein synthesizing system was developed from rabbit reticulocytes ribosomes, using the endogenous mRNA on the ribosomes. An analogous system was developed with human reticulocyte ribosomes.

=== Isolation of human messenger RNA ===
A procedure was developed for stripping the putative mRNA from the ribosomes. This ribosomal wash from rabbit reticulocyte ribosomes was incubated in a cell-free system and rabbit hemoglobin was produced. The procedure for stripping endogenous mRNA from rabbit reticulocyte ribosomes was used on human reticulocyte ribosomes to obtain human globin mRNA.

=== Synthesis of normal and mutant globin proteins using human globin mRNA ===
Stripped rabbit reticulocyte ribosomes were programmed with mRNA isolated from thalassemia, sickle cell anemia, or normal human reticulocytes. The rabbit ribosome cell-free system was able to produce normal human globin from normal human mRNA, sickle cell globin from sickle cell mRNA, and the abnormal alpha/beta globin chain abnormality of thalassemia from thalassemia mRNA.

=== Microinjection of globin DNA into mammalian cell nuclei ===
As a first approach for developing a human gene therapy procedure, standard microinjection techniques were modified to permit the injection of DNA plasmids into the nucleus of mammalian cells. Human globin genes were microinjected into mouse fibroblasts and into mouse oocytes and shown to express human globin mRNA.

=== Development of retroviral gene therapy vectors ===
Microinjecting a few non-stem cells was clearly not an efficient procedure for a clinical protocol. In 1984, Anderson published a major review in Science in which he analyzed the "Prospects for Human Gene Therapy" and concluded that the most promising approach was to use retroviral vectors as a delivery vehicle. He immediately established a close, long-term collaboration with one of the top retroviral vector scientists: Eli Gilboa, then at Princeton. Together they developed vectors that could efficiently carry a gene package into mouse or human cells in culture.

The most efficient vector, N2, carrying a neomycin resistance gene, was used to transduce mouse bone marrow cells. The N2-transduced cells were injected into lethally irradiated mice where they repopulated the marrow. The presence and expression of the N2 vector could be detected in the repopulated mouse bone marrow cells by testing for the resistance of the marrow cells to the toxic antibiotic neomycin.

Once the procedure was working successfully in mice, successful studies were done in non human primates. In addition, extensive safety studies were done in the vector transduced animals.

=== Successful gene therapy of a human patient ===
Attempting to perform gene therapy by inserting recombinant DNA into a human being was extremely controversial after an illegal attempt was made by Martin Cline in 1980. Anderson, together with bioethicist John Fletcher, set the ethical standard for this type of clinical protocol in his 1980 article in The New England Journal of Medicine entitled: "Gene Therapy In Human Beings: When Is It Ethical To Begin?" An extensive regulatory process was established during the late 1980s, including the creation of the Human Gene Therapy Subcommittee as a first round of regulatory oversight. Only after approval by that formal public governmental review did the gene therapy clinical protocol move on for review by the Recombinant DNA Advisory Committee (RAC), the FDA, and other ethics/regulatory committees. The media followed every step closely.

Anderson teamed with Michael Blaese, a prominent immunologist in the National Cancer Institute (NCI), and Steven Rosenberg, a prominent cancer surgeon and immunotherapy advocate, also in the NCI. The initial protocol was a safety study where only the N2 vector, previously shown to be safe when used in non-human primates, was administered to cancer patients, on Rosenberg's NCI clinical cancer service, who volunteered for the study. A full "gene therapy" regulatory review was carried out. The clinical protocol began on May 22, 1989, and included 10 patients. The procedure was shown to be safe. Rosenberg went on to develop gene therapy/immunotherapy clinical protocols for cancer.

Anderson and Blaese carried out the first gene therapy protocol, on a 4-year-old girl, named Ashanthi DeSilva, who was critically ill with adenosine deaminase deficiency severe combined immunodeficiency disease (ADA SCID). Preliminary studies included development of a retroviral vector containing the ADA gene together with additional safety features, creation of ADA deficient human T cell lines used for testing ADA vectors, and creation of a biotechnology company, Genetic Therapy Inc., to manufacture the ADA vector, called LASN, under strict GMP FDA requirements. Anderson also created, and became editor-in-chief of, a new journal, Human Gene Therapy, in 1990. This new journal published not only original scientific research papers but also articles on ethical and regulatory issues relating to gene therapy.

Ashanthi received her first infusion of cells on September 14, 1990, with no complications. She received 10 more infusions over the next 2 years. Her immune evaluation studies became normal and she became healthy with no major infections. A thorough immune status follow-up was done after 12 years: she remained healthy with 20% of her lymphocytes still carrying an active retroviral ADA gene – a sufficient percentage to ensure immunologic protection. She is now 33 years old, married, and works as a journalist and writer.

=== Late career research projects ===
In 1992, Anderson followed his wife to Los Angeles, where she accepted the position of chief of surgery at Los Angeles Children's Hospital. He became professor of biochemistry and pediatrics at the University of Southern California (USC). Anderson maintained his intense interest in gene therapy and was able to develop a retroviral gene therapy vector that could target the collagen matrix surrounding cancer nodules. He wrote a number of reviews of gene therapy in both the scientific literature and in the popular literature.

Anticipating the value of lab-on-a-chip technology for the molecular analysis of individual cells, Anderson joined forces with Stephen Quake, professor of applied physics at California Institute of Technology. Quake was developing lab-on-a-chip technology using soft polymers. Anderson became a visiting associate in applied physics at Caltech from 2001 to 2006, while maintaining his USC positions, and succeeded in developing an improved microfluidic valve that was patented and has become the core of soft polymer lab-on-a-chip devices.

His final project before he was arrested was the discovery and identification of a factor in the serum of irradiated animals that could rescue lethally irradiated animals even 24 hours after the irradiation. Purification from the serum demonstrated that the factor was Interleukin 12. During the 12 years that Anderson has been in prison, IL-12 has been shown to potentially be a very important adjuvant drug in cancer treatment.

== Other activities ==
=== Sports medicine ===
Anderson has been a ring doctor and tournament doctor in a large number of competitions. In 1981, he became the team physician for the National Taekwondo Team, and was also the team physician at the 1988 Olympics in Seoul Korea when taekwondo became an Olympic sport. He has written several sports medicine articles on prevention and treatment of taekwondo injuries. In addition, he was chairman of the medical committee of the World Taekwondo Federation from 1985 to 1988.

=== Forensic medicine ===
Anderson is best known in forensic medicine for his forensic analysis of the famous April 11, 1986 FBI firefight which, at the time, was the deadliest firefight in the history of the FBI. His analysis, privately printed in 1996, was accepted by the FBI as the official version, and every new FBI agent was given a copy of his report. After 10 years, the FBI allowed Anderson to make the report public, and it was published with a new foreword by Paladin Press in 2006.

Anderson also published a forensic analysis of the Warren Earp killing, as well as a study of the bruises beneath soft body armor when bullets of various calibers strike a person wearing the armor.

== Sexual abuse conviction ==
Anderson was arrested on July 30, 2004, on allegations of sexual abuse of a minor girl. He was convicted and jailed on July 19, 2006, of three counts of lewd acts upon a child under the age of 14, and one count of continuous sexual abuse. On February 2, 2007, he was sentenced to 14 years in prison and ordered to pay $68,000 in restitution, fines, and fees. Scientific colleagues regarded his sentence as a "loss for science". The victim was the daughter of his senior lab scientist and business partner from China. The jury was played a recorded conversation between Anderson and the victim in which Anderson is heard saying a number of damaging statements, calling his own behavior "evil." Additional evidence presented at the trial included several emails between Anderson and the victim. He was eligible for parole after serving 85 percent of his sentence. He was released from prison in May 2018 with parole.

== Published books ==
- Development of Iron Chelators for Clinical Use. Anderson, W.F. and Hiller, H.C., eds., DHEW Publ. No. (NIH) 76-994, 1976.
- Fourth Cooley's Anemia Symposium. Anderson, W.F.; Bank, A.; Zaino, E.C., eds., Ann. NY Acad. Sci., Vol. 344, 1980.
- Development of Iron Chelators for Clinical Use: Proceedings of the Second Symposium. Martell, A.E.; Anderson, W.F.; Badman, D., eds., Elsevier-North Holland, New York, 1981.
- Fifth Cooley's Anemia Symposium. Bank, A.; Anderson, W.F.; Zaino, E.C., eds., Ann. NY Acad. Sci., Vol. 445, 1985.
- Forensic Analysis of the April 11, 1986, FBI Firefight. Anderson, W.F., Paladin Press, 2006. ISBN 1581604904

== Awards and honors ==
1954-1964	Harvard National Scholarship
1957-1958	Francis H. Burr Scholar of Harvard University
1958-1959	Charles Henry Fiske Ill Scholar at Trinity College, Cambridge University, England
1959-1960	Knox Fellow at Trinity College, Cambridge University, England
1977	The Thomas B. Cooley Award for Scientific Achievement, awarded by the Cooley's Anemia Blood and Research Foundation for Children
1991	The 1991 Mary Ann Liebert Biotherapeutics Award
1991	Ralph R. Braund Award in Cancer Research, University of Tennessee
1992	Honorary Doctorate of Humane Letters, University of Oklahoma
1992	1992 Award for Excellence in Technology Transfer, awarded by the Federal Laboratory Consortium, Executive Branch, U.S. Government
1992	Fellow, AAAS
1992	Myron Karon Memorial Lectureship, Children's Hospital Los Angeles, Los Angeles, CA
1993	Distinguished Scientist Lecture, International and American Associations for Dental Research
1993	Plenary Lecture, 17th International Congress of Genetics
1993	CIBA-Drew Award in Biomedical Research
1993	The National Hemophilia Foundation – Dr. Murray Thelin Award
1994	The King Faisal International Prize in Medicine
1994	Runner up: Time magazine Man-of-the-Year
1995	Keynote Lecture, Gene Therapy and Molecular Medicine Conference, Keystone Symposia
1995	The National Biotechnology Award, Oxford Bioscience Partners
1995	Sheen Award, National Westminster Bank
1996	Genesis Award, Pacific Center for Health Policy and Ethics, USC
1996	1996 Humanitarian Award, National Organization of Rare Disorders (NORD)
1996	Tribute Symposium "ln Utero Stem Cell Transplantation and Gene Therapy, A Scientific Symposium in Honor of: W. French Anderson, M.D. and George Stamatoyannopoulos, M.D., Dr. Sci".
1996	Keynote Speaker, Inauguration Programme, San Raffaele Biomedical Science Park Congress Centre, Milan Italy
1998	Inductee, Oklahoma Hall of Fame
2002	Hamdan International Award for Medical Excellence
2003	Coudert Institute Award for Medical Sciences
2003	Pioneers of Molecular Biology, Time magazine
2003	Honorary Professor, Sun Vat-sen University Cancer Center, Guangzhou, China
2003	Honorary Professor, Peking Union Medical Center, Beijing China
2004	Profiles in Science, National Library of Medicine, NIH
