= Eladocagene exuparvovec =

Gene therapy medication

Gene therapy
- Target gene: Aromatic L-amino acid decarboxylase

Clinical data
- Trade names: Upstaza
- Other names: PTC-AADC, eladocagene exuparvovec-tneq
- AHFS/Drugs.com: Monograph
- MedlinePlus: a624080
- License data: US DailyMed: Eladocagene exuparvovec
- Routes of administration: Brain infusion
- ATC code: A16AB26 (WHO)

Legal status
- Legal status: US: ℞-only; EU: Rx-only

Identifiers
- CAS Number: 2098615-91-7
- DrugBank: DB16780
- UNII: S51J6N56M7
- KEGG: D12407

Eladocagene exuparvovec, sold under the brand name Upstaza among others, is a gene therapy product for the treatment of aromatic L‑amino acid decarboxylase (AADC) deficiency. It infuses the gene encoding for the human aromatic L-amino acid decarboxylase enzyme into the putamen region of the brain. The subsequent expression of aromatic L-amino acid decarboxylase results in dopamine production and, as a result, development of motor function in people with aromatic L-amino acid decarboxylase deficiency. Eladocagene exuparvovec is an adeno-associated virus vector-based gene therapy.

The most common side effects include initial insomnia, irritability and dyskinesia. The most common side effects of eladocagene exuparvovec (Kebilidi) include dyskinesia (involuntary muscle movements), fever, low blood pressure, anemia (low red blood cell count), increased saliva production, insomnia, low levels of potassium, phosphate, and/or magnesium, and procedural complications such as respiratory and cardiac arrest.

Eladocagene exuparvovec was approved for medical use in the European Union in July 2022, and in the United States in November 2024.

== Medical uses ==
Eladocagene exuparvovec is indicated for the treatment of aromatic L-amino acid decarboxylase (AADC) deficiency.

Aromatic L-amino acid decarboxylase deficiency is a rare genetic disorder that affects the production of some neurotransmitters, which are chemical messengers that allow cells in the body's nervous system to communicate with each other. Affected individuals may experience symptoms such as delays in gross motor function (head control, sitting, standing, and walking), hypotonia (weak muscle tone), and developmental and cognitive delays.

== Contraindications ==
Eladocagene exuparvovec is contraindicated in people who have not achieved skull maturity assessed by neuroimaging.

== History ==
The safety and effectiveness of eladocagene exuparvovec were demonstrated in an open-label, single-arm clinical study in 13 children with confirmed diagnosis of aromatic L-amino acid decarboxylase deficiency. At the start of the study, all participants had no gross motor function (the most severe presentation of aromatic L-amino acid decarboxylase deficiency) and decreased aromatic L-amino acid decarboxylase activity in the plasma. Participants treated with eladocagene exuparvovec were compared to untreated participants (natural history). Motor milestone assessments were completed for 12 of the 13 participants at week 48 after receiving the treatment. The efficacy of eladocagene exuparvovec was demonstrated based on gross motor function improvement in 8 of 12 treated participants, which has not been reported in untreated participants with the severe presentation of aromatic L-amino acid decarboxylase deficiency.

== Society and culture ==
=== Legal status ===
In May 2022, the Committee for Medicinal Products for Human Use of the European Medicines Agency adopted a positive opinion, recommending the granting of a marketing authorization under exceptional circumstances for the medicinal product Upstaza, intended for the treatment of aromatic L‑amino acid decarboxylase (AADC) deficiency. As Upstaza is an advanced therapy medicinal product, the CHMP positive opinion is based on an assessment by the Committee for Advanced Therapies. The applicant for this medicinal product is PTC Therapeutics International Limited. Eladocagene exuparvovec was approved for medical use in the European Union in July 2022.

Eladocagene exuparvovec was approved for medical use in the United States in November 2024. The US Food and Drug Administration (FDA) granted the application for eladocagene exuparvovec priority review and orphan drug designations, and a rare pediatric disease priority review voucher. It was approved under the accelerated approval pathway. The FDA granted approval of Kebilidi to PTC Therapeutics.

=== Names ===
Eladocagene exuparvovec is the international nonproprietary name (INN), and the United States Adopted Name.

Eladocagene exuparvovec is sold under the brand names Upstaza and Kebilidi.
