= Aromatic L-amino acid decarboxylase deficiency =

- Other names: AADC deficiency
- Specialty: Neurology
- Symptoms: Dystonia, oculogyric crises, developmental delay, parkinsonism, dysautonomia
- Usual onset: Infancy
- Causes: Autosomal recessive DDC mutation
- Diagnostic method: Lumbar puncture for neurotransmitter analysis; enzyme assay; genetic testing

Aromatic L-amino acid decarboxylase deficiency, also known as AADC deficiency, is a rare genetic disorder caused by mutations in the DDC gene, which encodes an enzyme called aromatic L-amino acid decarboxylase.

== Signs and symptoms ==
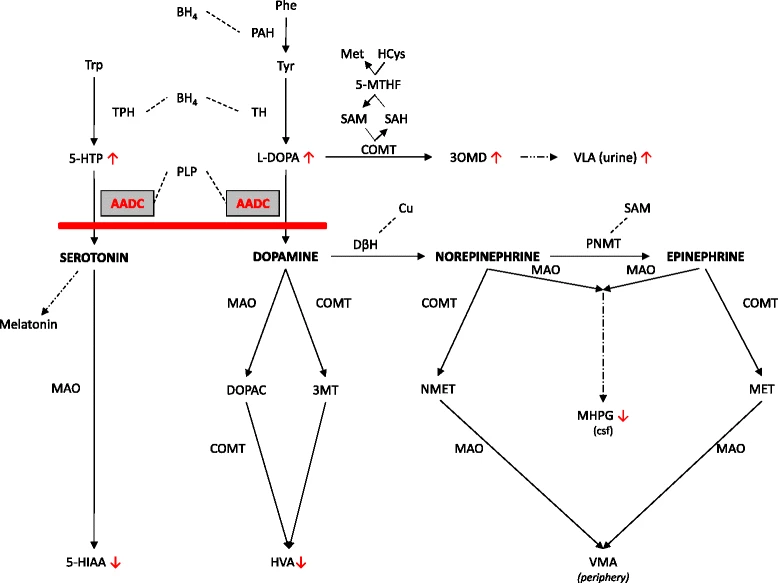
Biosynthesis and breakdown of serotonin and the catecholamines, and the metabolic block in aromatic L-amino acid decarboxylase deficiency, Wassenberg et al., 2017.

Babies with severe aromatic L-amino acid decarboxylase deficiency usually present to clinicians during the first few months of life. Symptoms can include:

- Hypotonia (floppiness)
- Developmental delay
- Oculogyric crises
- Difficulty with initiating and controlling movements
- Dystonia and dyskinesia
- Gastointestinal dysmotility which can present at as vomiting, gastro-oesophageal reflux, diarrhoea and/or constipation
- Autonomic symptoms including difficulties controlling temperature and blood sugar, excessive sweating and nasal congestion

Some people may develop cerebral folate deficiency, because O-methylation of the excessive amounts of L-DOPA can deplete methyl donors such as S-adenosyl methionine and levomefolic acid. This deviation can be detected by measuring the levels of levomefolic acid in the cerebrospinal fluid, and can be corrected by folinic acid.

== Genetics ==
Aromatic L-amino acid decarboxylase deficiency has an autosomal recessive pattern of inheritance

Aromatic L-amino acid decarboxylase deficiency is an autosomal recessive condition, meaning an individual needs to have two faulty copies of the DDC gene in order to be affected. Usually, one copy is inherited from each parent.

== Pathophysiology ==
The aromatic L-amino acid decarboxylase deficiency enzyme is involved in the synthesis of dopamine and serotonin, both of which are important neurotransmitters.

== Diagnosis ==
There are three core diagnostic tools:

1. molecular genetics - proving compound heterozygous or homozygous disease causing variants in the DDC gene
2. CSF examination - low levels of 5-HIAA, HVA, and MHPG, increased levels of 3-OMD, L-DOPA and 5-HTP, and normal levels of pterins
3. serum examination - decreased AADC enzyme activity

To establish the diagnosis of AADCD, patient must have positive genetic testing (1st criterion) while also fulfilling either one of the other two criteria.

Elevated 3-OMD levels in serum can be used as a simple and sensitive screening test, positive result of which must be confirmed by the diagnostic criteria above.

== Treatment ==
There is no cure for aromatic L-amino acid decarboxylase deficiency, but medical and multidisciplinary treatment can relieve some of the symptoms. Individuals will require physiotherapy, occupational therapy, and speech and language therapy. Some will need enteral feeding (for example, a gastrostomy or jejunostomy) due to difficulties with chewing and swallowing.

Various medications can help compensate for the missing neurotransmitters. Dopamine agonists such as rotigotine or pramipexole and monoamine oxidase inhibitors such as selegiline are commonly used. Individuals may also need to take a range of other medications to control dyskinesia, constipation and other symptoms.

In July 2021, results of a small gene therapy phase I study reported observation of dopamine restoration on seven participants between 4 and 9 years old.

In July 2022, the gene therapy product eladocagene exuparvovec was approved in the European Union for use in patients aged 18 months or older.
