= Deoxyadenosine triphosphate =

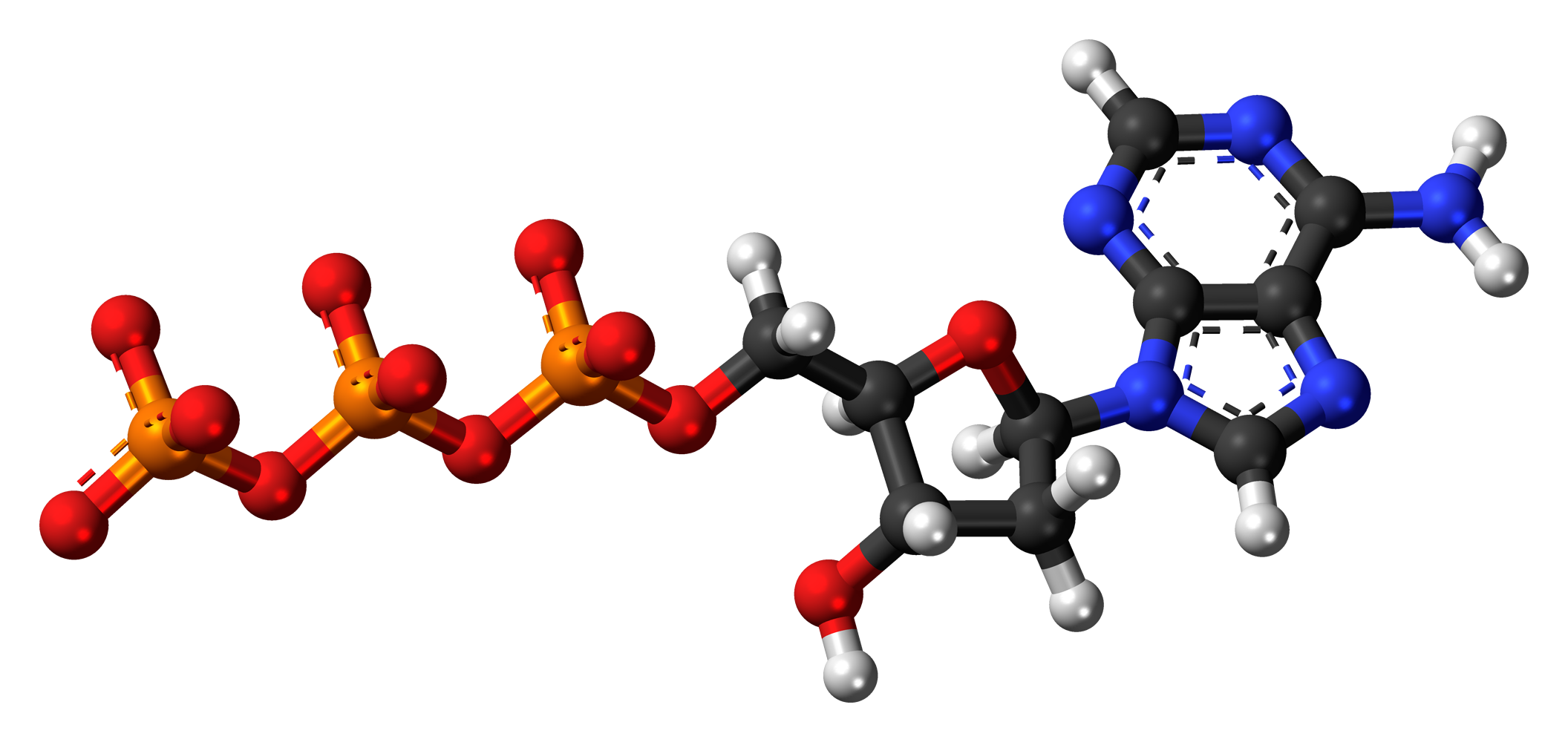

Names
- IUPAC name [[(2R,3S,5R)-5-(6-aminopurin-9-yl)-3-hydroxyoxolan-2-yl]methoxy-hydroxyphosphoryl] phosphono hydrogen phosphate
- Other names dATP, 2'-deoxyadenosine triphosphate

Identifiers
CAS Number	1927-31-7
3D model (JSmol)	Interactive image
ChEBI	CHEBI:16284
ChEMBL	ChEMBL335538
ChemSpider	15194 = = =
ECHA InfoCard	100.016.058
IUPHAR/BPS	1760
PubChem CID	15993
UNII	K8KCC8SH6N
CompTox Dashboard (EPA)	DTXSID10895848
- InChI: InChI=1S/C10H16N5O12P3/c11-9-8-10(13-3-12-9)15(4-14-8)7-1-5(16)6(25-7)2-24-29(20,21)27-30(22,23)26-28(17,18)19/h3-7,16H,1-2H2,(H,20,21)(H,22,23)(H2,11,12,13)(H2,17,18,19)/t5-,6+,7+/m0/s1 = Key: SUYVUBYJARFZHO-RRKCRQDMSA-N =; InChI=1/C10H16N5O12P3/c11-9-8-10(13-3-12-9)15(4-14-8)7-1-5(16)6(25-7)2-24-29(20,21)27-30(22,23)26-28(17,18)19/h3-7,16H,1-2H2,(H,20,21)(H,22,23)(H2,11,12,13)(H2,17,18,19)/t5-,6+,7+/m0/s1 Key: SUYVUBYJARFZHO-RRKCRQDMBD
- SMILES: O=P(O)(O)OP(=O)(O)OP(=O)(O)OC[C@H]3O[C@@H](n2cnc1c(ncnc12)N)C[C@@H]3O

Properties
Chemical formula	C_{10}H_{16}N_{5}O_{12}P_{3}
Molar mass	491.181623
- Except where otherwise noted, data are given for materials in their standard state (at 25 °C [77 °F], 100 kPa). verify (what is ?) Infobox references

Deoxyadenosine triphosphate (dATP) is a nucleotide used in cells for DNA synthesis (or replication), as a substrate of DNA polymerase.

Deoxyadenosine triphosphate is produced from DNA by the action of nuclease P1, adenylate kinase, and pyruvate kinase.

== Health effects ==
High levels of dATP can be toxic and result in impaired immune function, since dATP acts as a noncompetitive inhibitor for the DNA synthesis enzyme ribonucleotide reductase. Patients with adenosine deaminase deficiency (ADA) tend to have elevated intracellular dATP concentrations because adenosine deaminase normally curbs adenosine levels by converting it into inosine. Deficiency of this deaminase also causes immunodeficiency.

In cardiac myosin, dATP is an alternative to ATP as an energy substrate for facilitating cross-bridge formation.

== See also ==
- Adenosine triphosphate (ATP)
- Adenosine deaminase deficiency (ADA)
- Dilated cardiomyopathy (DCM)
