= Rexin G =

Genetic cancer medication

Identifiers
- CAS Number: 1023923-93-4

Rexin G is a tumor-targeted genetic medication for cancer. Its primary mechanism is a retrovector bearing a cytocidal cyclin G1 construct, which is a form of targeted gene therapy vector used to get a fast track orphan drug priority for multiple cancer indications within the United States. After phase one and two clinical trials, the drug has been shown to effectively shrink metastatic tumors and triple the survival times of chemotherapy-resistant pancreatic cancers. Recent studies have also confirmed the overall safety of the Rexin G drug and have shown that Rexin-G monotherapy, at the recommended dose levels, exhibits significant anti-tumor activity and increases both overall survival time and the survival rates in the majority of patients.

== History ==
While the molecular cloning and the characterization of the G1 proto-oncogene began in 1994, the design and the constructs of the first target delivery system began in 1995, though it was not possible to implement int until late 1997. The initial concepts behind Rexin-G was first possible in 2002 and the first toxicology studies of the drug began in 2004. Studies into the effective of the drug soon began after the drug was found to be non-toxic in both mammals in the 2005. With the introduction of clinical grade vectors in the 2006, the drug soon saw widespread testing in late 2006.

Rexin-G was officially accepted by Philippine FDA in late 2007 for the treatment of all solid tumors and this led to rapid progression in clinical studies during the late 2008. In the late stages of 2011 Rexin-G entered phase three trials. The phase one and two trials have now successfully been completed.
