= Cambiogenplasmid =

Gene therapy medication

Gene therapy
- Target gene: VEGF
- Vector: Plasmid

Clinical data
- Trade names: Neovasculgen
- Other names: Pl-VEGF165
- Routes of administration: Intraneural injection
- ATC code: V03AX (WHO)

Identifiers
- CAS Number: 1540077-18-6
- ChemSpider: none

Cambiogenplasmid, sold under the brand name Neovasculgen, is a gene therapy drug for treatment of peripheral artery disease, including critical limb ischemia; it delivers the gene encoding for vascular endothelial growth factor (VEGF). Neovasculogen is a plasmid encoding the CMV promoter and the 165 amino acid form of VEGF. It was developed by the Human Stem Cells Institute in Russia and approved in Russia in 2011.

Cambiogenplasmid formulation was invented and developed by Zagit Gaymalov in Alexander Kabanov's lab at the University of Nebraska Medical Center in 2005. Kabanov and his team demonstrated that certain block copolymers could induce transient plasmid expression in muscle tissue for up to a month.

Inspired by this discovery, Gaymalov, then a graduate student, explored its potential for clinical applications, focusing on prolonged gene expression. One of the most pressing medical challenges at the time was hind-limb ischemia, a condition with significant unmet clinical needs and no pharmacological treatments available beyond surgery or amputation. Under the guidance of Irving Zucker and Maram Reddy, Gaymalov developed a murine model to replicate hind-limb ischemia conditions.

The initial formulation consisted of a plasmid encoding VEGF 165 under the CMV promoter, combined with the non-ionic carrier SP1017, composed of two amphiphilic block copolymers (Pluronics L61 and F127). In 2006, this work earned a pre-doctoral fellowship from the American Heart Association and led to multiple publications. By 2011, the exact formulation received approval for clinical use in Russia.
