= Martin Cline =

American biologist

Martin J. Cline (born 1934) is an American geneticist who is the Professor Emeritus of Medicine at the University of California, Los Angeles (UCLA). He did postdoctoral training in hematology-oncology at the University of Utah and was at the University of California, San Francisco before going to UCLA. His research has been in cell biology, molecular biology, and genetics.

== Accomplishments ==
Cline was the first to successfully transfer a functioning gene into a living mouse, creating the first transgenic organism. His research has also pertained to the molecular genetic alterations in cancer, especially in leukemia.

In 1980, Cline conducted a rDNA transfer into the bone marrow cells of two patients with hereditary blood disorders. He did so in direct opposition to National Institute of Health gene therapy guidelines and without the approval of the Institutional Review Board at the University of California Los Angeles (UCLA), where his research was conducted. The ethical concerns that were generated prompted a call for review by a number of organizations—including the National Council of Churches, Synagogue Council of America, and the United States Catholic Conference. Consequently, Cline was forced to resign his department chairmanship at UCLA and lost several research grants.
