= Obecabtagene autoleucel =

Gene therapy medication

Gene therapy
- Target gene: CD19

Clinical data
- Trade names: Aucatzyl
- AHFS/Drugs.com: Monograph
- MedlinePlus: a624084
- License data: US DailyMed: Obecabtagene autoleucel
- Routes of administration: Intravenous infusion
- ATC code: L01XL12 (WHO)

Legal status
- Legal status: US: ℞-only; EU: Rx-only

Identifiers
- DrugBank: DB17362
- UNII: 760HJB0YRD
- KEGG: D13022

Obecabtagene autoleucel, sold under the brand name Aucatzyl, is an anti-cancer medication used for the treatment of acute lymphoblastic leukemia marketed by Autolus Therapeutics, UK. It is a CD19-directed genetically modified autologous T-cell immunotherapy.

The most common side effects include cytokine release syndrome, infections-pathogen unspecified, musculoskeletal pain, viral infections, fever, nausea, bacterial infectious disorders, diarrhea, febrile neutropenia, immune effector cell-associated neurotoxicity syndrome, hypotension, pain, fatigue, headache, encephalopathy, and hemorrhage.

Obecabtagene autoleucel was approved for medical use in the United States in November 2024.

== Medical uses ==
Obecabtagene autoleucel is indicated for the treatment of adults with relapsed or refractory B-cell precursor acute lymphoblastic leukemia.

== Side effects ==
The US Food and Drug Administration (FDA) approved prescribing information for obecabtagene autoleucel has a boxed warning for cytokine release syndrome, immune effector cell-associated neurotoxicity syndrome, and T-cell malignancies.

The most common side effects include cytokine release syndrome, infections-pathogen unspecified, musculoskeletal pain, viral infections, fever, nausea, bacterial infectious disorders, diarrhea, febrile neutropenia, immune effector cell-associated neurotoxicity syndrome, hypotension, pain, fatigue, headache, encephalopathy, and hemorrhage.

== History ==
Efficacy was evaluated in FELIX (NCT04404660), an open-label, multicenter, single-arm trial that enrolled adults with relapsed or refractory CD19-positive B-cell acute lymphoblastic leukemia. Enrolled participants were required to have relapsed following a remission lasting twelve months or less, relapsed or refractory acute lymphoblastic leukemia following two or more prior lines of systemic therapy, or disease that was relapsed or refractory three or more months after allogeneic stem cell transplantation.

The major efficacy outcome measures were rate and duration of complete remission achieved within three months after infusion. Additional outcome measures were rate and duration of overall complete remission which includes complete remission and complete remission with incomplete hematologic recovery, at any time. Of the 65 participants evaluable for efficacy, 27 participants (42%; 95% confidence interval [CI]: 29%, 54%) achieved complete remission within three months. The median duration of complete remission achieved within three months was 14.1 months (95% CI: 6.1, not reached).

The US Food and Drug Administration (FDA) granted the application for obecabtagene autoleucel regenerative medicine advanced therapy (RMAT) and orphan drug designations.

== Society and culture ==
=== Legal status ===
Obecabtagene autoleucel was approved for medical use in the United States in November 2024.

In May 2025, the Committee for Medicinal Products for Human Use of the European Medicines Agency adopted a positive opinion, recommending the granting of a conditional marketing authorization for the medicinal product Aucatzyl, intended for the treatment of adults from 26 years of age with relapsed or refractory B cell precursor acute lymphoblastic leukemia. The applicant for this medicinal product is Autolus GmbH. Obecabtagene autoleucel was authorized for medical use in the European Union in July 2025.

=== Names ===
Obecabtagene autoleucel is the international nonproprietary name.

It is sold under the brand name Aucatzyl.
