= Lovotibeglogene autotemcel =

Gene therapy

Clinical data
- Trade names: Lyfgenia
- Other names: bb1111, lovo-cel, LentiGlobin for sickle cell disease
- AHFS/Drugs.com: Lyfgenia
- License data: US DailyMed: Lovotibeglogene autotemcel
- Routes of administration: Intravenous
- ATC code: B06AX06 (WHO)

Legal status
- Legal status: US: ℞-only

Identifiers
- DrugBank: DB18680
- UNII: 2C6A9NH2Z8
- KEGG: D12765

Lovotibeglogene autotemcel, sold under the brand name Lyfgenia, is a lentiviral gene therapy used for the treatment of sickle cell disease.

The most common side effects include stomatitis (mouth sores of the lips, mouth, and throat), low levels of platelets, white blood cells, and red blood cells, and febrile neutropenia (fever and low white blood cell count), consistent with chemotherapy and underlying disease.

The US Food and Drug Administration (FDA) approved lovotibeglogene autotemcel in December 2023.

== Medical uses ==
Lovotibeglogene autotemcel is indicated for the treatment of people aged twelve years of age and older with sickle cell disease and a history of vaso-occlusive events.

The recipient's blood stem cells are genetically modified to produce HbA (T87Q), a gene-therapy derived hemoglobin A, which is similar to the normal adult hemoglobin produced in persons not affected by sickle cell disease. Red blood cells containing HbA (T87Q) have a lower risk of sickling and occluding blood flow. These modified stem cells are then delivered to the recipient.

The gene therapy is made from the recipient's own blood stem cells, which are modified, and are given back as a one-time, single-dose infusion as part of a hematopoietic (blood) stem cell transplant. Prior to treatment, the recipient's own stem cells are collected, and then the recipient must undergo myeloablative conditioning (high-dose chemotherapy), a process that removes cells from the bone marrow so they can be replaced with the modified cells in lovotibeglogene autotemcel.

== Side effects ==
The US FDA label contains a black box warning about hematologic malignancy (blood cancer).

== History ==
The safety and effectiveness of lovotibeglogene autotemcel is based on the analysis of data from a single-arm, 24-month multicenter study in participants with sickle cell disease and history of Vaso-occlusive episodes (VOEs) between the ages of twelve and fifty years. Effectiveness was evaluated based on complete resolution of VOEs (VOE-CR) between six and eighteen months after infusion with lovotibeglogene autotemcel. Twenty-eight (88%) of 32 participants achieved VOE-CR during this time period.

The FDA granted the application for lovotibeglogene autotemcel priority review, orphan drug, fast track, and regenerative medicine advanced therapy designations. The FDA granted approval of Lyfgenia to Bluebird Bio Inc.

In March 2025, Cohen Children's Medical Center announced that through the use of this treatment the first person in New York State was cured of sickle cell anemia.

== Society and culture ==
=== Economics ===
The cost effectiveness threshold of the therapy is estimated to be between US$1.35 million to $2.05 million.

=== Brand names ===
Lovotibeglogene autotemcel is the international nonproprietary name.

Lovotibeglogene autotemcel is sold under the brand name Lyfgenia.
