= BeneluxA =

Pharmaceutical initiative

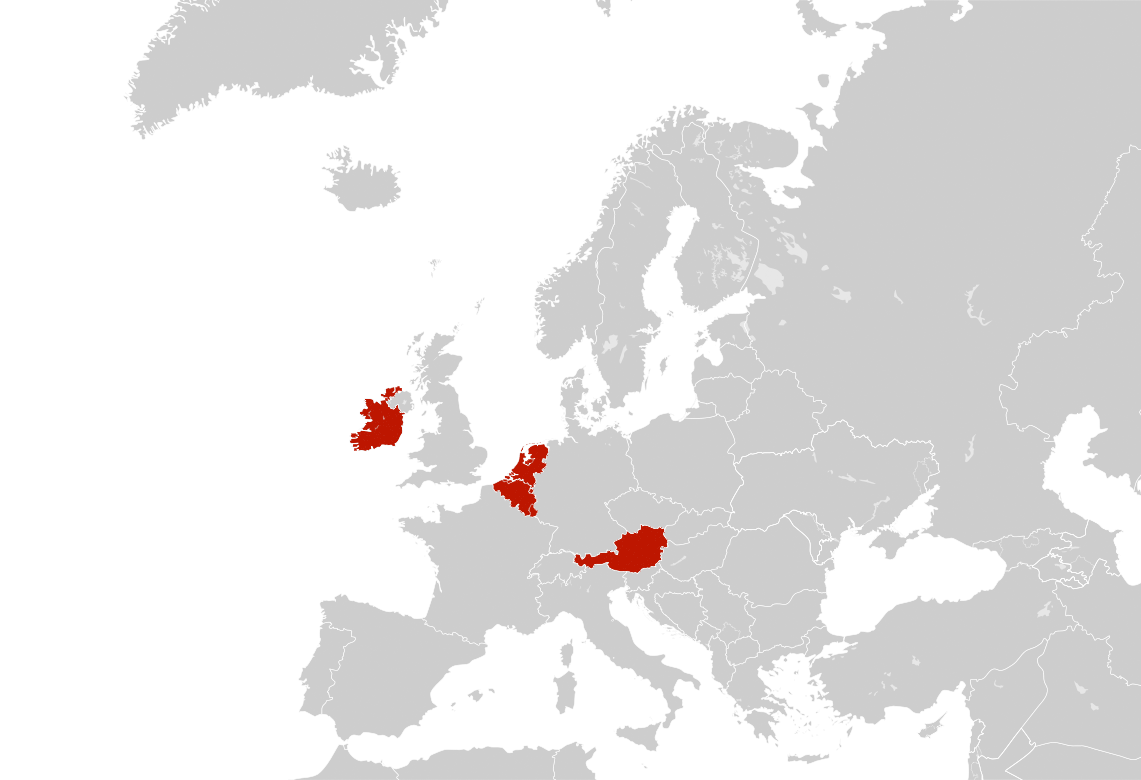
- Membership: Belgium; Netherlands; Luxembourg; Austria; Ireland

Establishment
  - Established: April 2015
  - Luxemburg joins: September 2015
  - Austria joins: June 2016
  - Ireland joins: June 2018
- Website http://www.beneluxa.org

The Beneluxa Initiative on Pharmaceutical Policy is an initiative involving health services in Belgium, the Netherlands, Luxembourg, Austria and Ireland to deliver sustainable access to innovative medications to people in these smaller countries. It was established in April 2015 by Belgium and the Netherlands. Luxemburg joined in September 2015, Austria in June 2016 and Ireland in June 2018. This covers a population of about 43 million people, and other countries may join in the future. The participants cooperate on health technology assessments, horizon scanning, exchange of strategic information and price/reimbursement negotiations.

In addition to jointly negotiating prices and benefits for pharmaceuticals and medical devices, the countries are also collaborating on "horizon scanning" to identify potential major pharmaceutical innovations before they are introduced to the market. The countries also cooperate in the field of "Health Technology Assessment", whereby the countries share data and policies to jointly assess innovative medical products and equipment.

In October 2018 it initiated the International Horizon Scanning Initiative as an international not-for-profit association which any country could join. This employs a sliding scale to signify the chances of EU market authorization from ‘unlikely’ to ‘uncertain’ and gives a forecast of the estimated date for commercial launch.

A similar alliance was initiated in May 2017, the Valletta Declaration, by Cyprus, Greece, Ireland, Italy, Malta, Portugal, Spain, Romania, Slovenia and Croatia. No information about its activities has been released.
