= Marnetegragene autotemcel =

Gene therapy medication

Clinical data
- Trade names: Kresladi
- Other names: RP-L201, Ladicell
- AHFS/Drugs.com: Monograph
- MedlinePlus: a626057
- License data: US DailyMed: Marnetegragene autotemcel
- Routes of administration: Intravenous infusion
- ATC code: None

Legal status
- Legal status: US: ℞-only

Identifiers
- UNII: RD86XHH46N
- KEGG: D13356

Marnetegragene autotemcel, sold under the brand name Kresladi, is a gene therapy used for the treatment of severe leukocyte adhesion deficiency type I.

Marnetegragene autotemcel consists of the recipient's hematopoietic (blood) stem cells, which are genetically modified to introduce functional copies of the ITGB2 gene. Following conditioning, a single dose of marnetegragene autotemcel is infused intravenously to address the underlying cause of severe leukocyte adhesion deficiency-1 by restoring CD18 and CD11a cell surface expression in white blood cells, including neutrophils.

Marnetegragene autotemcel was approved for medical use in the United States in March 2026.

== Medical uses ==
Marnetegragene autotemcel is indicated for the treatment of children with severe leukocyte adhesion deficiency I due to biallelic variants in ITGB2 without an available human leukocyte antigen-matched sibling donor for allogeneic hematopoietic stem cell transplant.

== Society and culture ==
=== Legal status ===
Marnetegragene autotemcel was approved for medical use in the United States in March 2026.

The US Food and Drug Administration (FDA) granted the application for marnetegragene autotemcel orphan drug, rare pediatric disease, regenerative medicine advanced therapy, and fast track designations. The FDA granted accelerated approval of Kresladi to Rocket Pharmaceuticals.

=== Names ===
Marnetegragene autotemcel is the international nonproprietary name.

Marnetegragene autotemcel is sold under the brand name Kresladi.
