= Nadofaragene firadenovec =

Gene therapy medication

Gene therapy
- Target gene: Interferon alfa-2b

Clinical data
- Trade names: Adstiladrin
- Other names: Nadofaragene firadenovec-vncg, Instilidrin, rAd-IFN/Syn3
- MedlinePlus: a623062
- License data: US DailyMed: Nadofaragene firadenovec
- Routes of administration: Intravesical
- ATC code: L01XL10 (WHO)

Legal status
- Legal status: CA: ℞-only; US: ℞-only; EU: Rx-only

Identifiers
- CAS Number: 1823059-12-6
- PubChem SID: 497620944
- DrugBank: DB17381
- UNII: 0OOS09O1FH
- KEGG: D12531

Nadofaragene firadenovec, sold under the brand name Adstiladrin, is a gene therapy for the treatment of bladder cancer. It is a non-replicating (cannot multiply in human cells) adenoviral vector-based gene therapy.

The most common adverse events including laboratory abnormalities, include increased glucose, instillation site discharge, increased triglycerides, fatigue, bladder spasm, micturition urgency, increased creatinine, hematuria, decreased phosphate, chills, dysuria, and pyrexia.

Nadofaragene firadenovec was approved for medical use in the United States in December 2022, and in the European Union in May 2026.

== Medical uses ==
Nadofaragene firadenovec is indicated for the treatment of adults with high-risk Bacillus Calmette-Guérin (BCG)-unresponsive non-muscle-invasive bladder cancer (NMIBC) with carcinoma in situ (CIS) with or without papillary tumors.

== History ==
The safety and effectiveness of nadofaragene firadenovec was evaluated in a multi-center clinical study (Study CS-003 (NCT02773849)) that included 157 participants with high-risk Bacillus Calmette-Guérin (BCG)-unresponsive non-muscle-invasive bladder cancer, 98 of whom had BCG-unresponsive carcinoma in situ with or without papillary tumors and could be evaluated for response. Participants received nadofaragene firadenovec once every three months for up to twelve months, or until unacceptable toxicity to therapy or recurrent high-grade non-muscle-invasive bladder cancer. Overall, 51% of enrolled participants using nadofaragene firadenovec therapy achieved a complete response (the disappearance of all signs of cancer as seen on cystoscopy, biopsied tissue, and urine). The median duration of response was 9.7 months. Forty-six percent of responding participants remained in complete response for at least one year. The major efficacy outcome measures were complete response at any time and duration of response. Complete response was defined as negative cystoscopy with applicable transurethral resection of bladder tumor and biopsies and urine cytology. Random bladder biopsies of five sites were conducted in participants remaining in complete response at twelve months.

The US Food and Drug Administration (FDA) granted the application for nadofaragene firadenovec priority review, breakthrough therapy, fast track, and orphan drug designations. The FDA granted approval of Adstiladrin to Ferring Pharmaceuticals A/S.

== Society and culture ==
=== Legal status ===
Nadofaragene firadenovec was approved for medical use in the United States in December 2022, and in the European Union in May 2026.

=== Names ===
Nadofaragene firadenovec is the international nonproprietary name (INN).

Nadofaragene firadenovec is sold under the brand name Adstiladrin.
