= Pariglasgene brecaparvovec =

Medication

Clinical data
- Trade names: Genglycos
- Other names: DTX-401, pariglasgene brecaparvovec-opnr
- AHFS/Drugs.com: Genglycos
- License data: US DailyMed: Pariglasgene brecaparvovec
- Routes of administration: Intravenous infusion
- ATC code: None

Legal status
- Legal status: US: ℞-only

Identifiers
- CAS Number: 2259927-72-3
- UNII: 7LP92X4WPE

Pariglasgene brecaparvovec, sold under the brand name Genglycos, is a gene therapy medication used for the treatment of glycogen storage disease type Ia. Pariglasgene brecaparvovec is an adeno-associated virus vector-based gene therapy. It is given via intravenous infusion.

Pariglasgene brecaparvovec was approved for medical use in the United States in August 2026.

== Medical uses ==
Pariglasgene brecaparvovec is indicated to reduce daily cornstarch intake as an adjunct to nutritional management in people aged eight years of age and older with glycogen storage disease type Ia.

Glycogen storage disease type Ia is caused by a genetic mutation that results in a missing enzyme called glucose-6-phosphatase. This enzyme normally releases free glucose (a simple sugar and main source of energy for the body) from the liver and kidneys into the bloodstream, helping to maintain stable blood sugar levels during fasting and between meals. This enzyme deficiency causes the blood sugar to drop dangerously low whenever a person goes too long without eating. The condition can lead to long-term metabolic complications that can impair normal function in certain organs and tissues.

Pariglasgene brecaparvovec is a one-time AAV8 based gene therapy designed to deliver a functional glucose-6-phosphatase gene to the liver, aiming to restore the deficient enzyme required to release stored glucose and ensure stable blood sugar levels when a person is fasting.

== History ==
The effectiveness of pariglasgene brecaparvovec was evaluated in a randomized, double-blind, placebo-controlled study in participants with GSDIa followed over 48 weeks after dosing. Participants treated with pariglasgene brecaparvovec demonstrated a statistically significant mean reduction from baseline in daily cornstarch intake of 31% compared to placebo, the study's primary endpoint. A mean reduction from baseline of one cornstarch dose per day was seen in the pariglasgene brecaparvovec group compared to placebo, the study's secondary endpoint. Pariglasgene brecaparvovec-treated participants experienced a numerical (mean 3%) increase in the percentage of glucose values in the hypoglycemic range (< 70 mg/dL) compared to placebo.

== Society and culture ==
=== Legal status ===
Pariglasgene brecaparvovec was approved for medical use in the United States in August 2026. The US Food and Drug Administration (FDA) granted the application for pariglasgene brecaparvovec regenerative medicine advanced therapy and fast track designations. The FDA granted accelerated approval of Genglycos to Ultragenyx Pharmaceutical.

=== Names ===
Pariglasgene brecaparvovec is the international nonproprietary name.

Pariglasgene brecaparvovec is sold under the brand name Genglycos.
