= Gendicine =

Gene therapy medication

Clinical data
- ATC code: None

Legal status
- Legal status: In general: ℞ (Prescription only)

Gendicine is a gene therapy medication used to treat patients with head and neck squamous cell carcinoma linked to mutations in the TP53 gene. It consists of recombinant adenovirus engineered to code for p53 protein (rAd-p53) and is manufactured by Shenzhen SiBiono GeneTech.

Gendicine was the first gene therapy product to obtain regulatory approval for clinical use in humans after Chinese State Food and Drug Administration approved it in 2003. As of 2024, Gendicine has not been approved for use in the United States and the European Union.

== Mechanism of action ==
Gendicine enters the tumour cells by way of receptor-mediated endocytosis and begins to over-express genes coding for the p53 protein needed to fight the tumour. Ad-p53 seems to act by stimulating the apoptotic pathway in tumour cells, which increases the expression of tumour suppressor genes and immune response factors (such as the ability of natural killer (NK) cells to exert "bystander" effects). It also decreases the expression of multi-drug resistance, vascular endothelial growth factor and matrix metalloproteinase-2 genes and blocking transcriptional survival signals.

Ad-p53 was developed in the laboratory of Jack A. Roth whose group also designed and completed the first Ad-p53 clinical trials. p53 mutation status of the tumour cells and response to Ad-p53 treatment are not closely correlated. Ad-p53 appears to act synergistically with conventional treatments such as chemo- and radiotherapy. This synergy still exists in patients with chemotherapy and radiotherapy-resistant tumors. Gendicine produces fewer side effects than conventional therapy.

== Related development ==
Contusugene ladenovec (Advexin), a similar gene therapy developed by Introgen that also uses adenovirus to deliver the p53 gene, was turned down by the FDA in 2008 and withdrawn by the maker from the EMA approval shortly after. Subsequent clinical trials confirmed the drug's safety and efficacy.
