= Stereotactic injection =

Stereotactic injection is a procedure in which a computer and a 3-dimensional scanning device are used to inject anticancer drugs directly into a tumor.

Stereotactic injection may also refer to the use of injections during stereotactic surgery to precisely target specific sites, such as brain regions, during experimental research.
