= Idecabtagene vicleucel =

Gene therapy medication

Gene therapy
- Target gene: TNFRSF17

Clinical data
- Trade names: Abecma
- Other names: bb2121, ide-cel
- AHFS/Drugs.com: Monograph
- MedlinePlus: a621024
- License data: US DailyMed: Idecabtagene vicleucel
- Routes of administration: Intravenous
- Drug class: Antineoplastic
- ATC code: L01XL07 (WHO)

Legal status
- Legal status: CA: ℞-only / Schedule D; US: ℞-only; EU: Rx-only

Identifiers
- UNII: 8PX1X7UG4D
- KEGG: D11556

Idecabtagene vicleucel, sold under the brand name Abecma, is a cell-based gene therapy to treat multiple myeloma.

The most common side effects include cytokine release syndrome (CRS), infections, fatigue, musculoskeletal pain, and a weakened immune system (hypogammaglobulinemia).

Idecabtagene vicleucel is a B-cell maturation antigen (BCMA)-directed genetically modified autologous chimeric antigen receptor (CAR) T-cell therapy. Each dose is customized using a patient's own T-cells, which are a type of white blood cell, that are collected and genetically modified to include a new gene that facilitates targeting and killing myeloma cells, and infused back into the patient.

Idecabtagene vicleucel was approved for medical use in the United States in March 2021. It is the first cell-based gene therapy approved by the US Food and Drug Administration for the treatment of multiple myeloma. It was authorized for medical use in the European Union in August 2021.

== Medical uses ==
Idecabtagene vicleucel is indicated for the treatment of adults with relapsed or refractory multiple myeloma after two or more prior lines of therapy, including an immunomodulatory agent, a proteasome inhibitor, and an anti-CD38 monoclonal antibody.

Multiple myeloma is an uncommon type of blood cancer in which abnormal plasma cells build up in the bone marrow and form tumors in many bones of the body. This disease keeps the bone marrow from making enough healthy blood cells, which can result in low blood counts. Myeloma can also damage the bones and the kidneys and weaken the immune system. The exact cause of multiple myeloma is unknown. According to the National Cancer Institute, myeloma accounted for approximately 1.8% (32,000) of all new cancer cases in the United States in 2020.

== Adverse effects ==
The US prescription label for idecabtagene vicleucel carries a boxed warning for cytokine release syndrome (CRS), neurologic toxicity, hemophagocytic lymphohistiocytosis/macrophage activation syndrome (HLH/MAS), and prolonged cytopenia. CRS and HLH/MAS are systemic responses to the activation and proliferation of CAR-T cells causing high fever and flu-like symptoms, and prolonged cytopenia is a drop in the number of a certain blood cell type for an extended period of time.

In April 2024, the boxed warning was expanded to include T cell malignancies.

== History ==
The safety and efficacy of idecabtagene vicleucel were evaluated in a multi-center study of 127 people with relapsed (myeloma that returns after completion of treatment) and refractory (myeloma that does not respond to treatment) multiple myeloma who received at least three prior lines of antimyeloma therapies; 88% had received four or more prior lines of therapies. Efficacy was evaluated in 100 people who received idecabtagene vicleucel in the dose range of 300 to 460 ×10^{6} CAR-positive T cells. Overall, 72% of people partially or completely responded to the treatment. Of those studied, 28% of people showed complete response—or disappearance of all signs of multiple myeloma—to idecabtagene vicleucel, and 65% of this group remained in complete response to the treatment for at least twelve months.

== Society and culture ==
=== Legal status ===
Idecabtagene vicleucel was approved for medical use in the United States in March 2021, and in the European Union in August 2021.

The US Food and Drug Administration (FDA) granted the application for idecabtagene vicleucel breakthrough therapy and orphan drug designations. The FDA granted approval of Abecma to Celgene Corporation, a Bristol-Myers Squibb Company.

=== Names ===
Idecabtagene vicleucel is the international nonproprietary name.

Idecabtagene vicleucel is sold under the brand name Abecma.
