= Prademagene zamikeracel =

Gene therapy medication

Clinical data
- Trade names: Zevaskyn
- Other names: EB-101
- AHFS/Drugs.com: Monograph
- MedlinePlus: a625079
- License data: US DailyMed: Prademagene zamikeracel
- Routes of administration: Topical
- ATC code: None

Legal status
- Legal status: US: ℞-only

Identifiers
- CAS Number: 2088280-15-1
- DrugBank: DB17895
- UNII: 4UU2O40RHU

Prademagene zamikeracel, sold under the brand name Zevaskyn, is an autologous cell-based gene therapy for the treatment of recessive dystrophic epidermolysis bullosa.

Prademagene zamikeracel is a cell sheet-based gene therapy for the treatment of wounds in people with recessive dystrophic epidermolysis bullosa, a rare and debilitating genetic skin disorder caused by mutations in the COL7A1 gene. The therapy utilizes the recipient's own skin cells, genetically engineered to express functional type VII collagen, which are expanded into sheets and surgically applied to chronic wounds.

Prademagene zamikeracel was approved for medical use in the United States in April 2025.

== Medical uses ==
Prademagene zamikeracel is indicated for the treatment of wounds in people with recessive dystrophic epidermolysis bullosa.

== Society and culture ==
=== Legal status ===
Prademagene zamikeracel was approved for medical use in the United States in April 2025.

=== Names ===
Prademagene zamikeracel is the international nonproprietary name.

Prademagene zamikeracel is sold under the brand name Zevaskyn.
