= Liver tumor =

- Other names: Hepatic tumors
- Specialty: Oncology, Gastroenterology, Hepatology
- Diagnostic method: medical imaging, liver biopsy
- Treatment: varies based on type

Liver tumors (also known as hepatic tumors) are abnormal growth of liver cells on or in the liver. Several distinct types of tumors can develop in the liver because the liver is made up of various cell types. Liver tumors can be classified as benign (non-cancerous) or malignant (cancerous) growths. They may be discovered on medical imaging (even for a different reason than the cancer itself), and the diagnosis is often confirmed with liver biopsy. Signs and symptoms of liver masses vary from being asymptomatic to patients presenting with an abdominal mass, hepatomegaly, abdominal pain, jaundice, or some other liver dysfunction. Treatment varies and is highly specific to the type of liver tumor.

== Classification ==
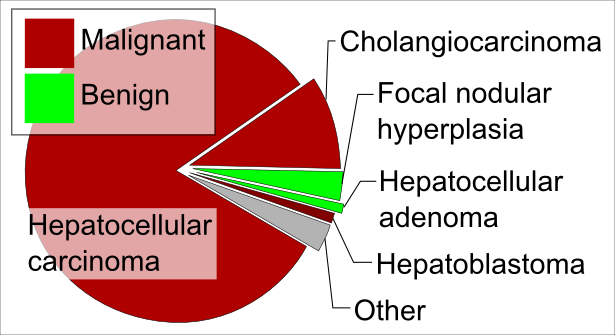
Liver tumor types by relative incidence in adults in the United States

Liver tumors can be broadly classified as benign or malignant:

=== Benign ===
There are several types of benign liver tumors. They are caused by either abnormal growth of neoplastic cells or in response to liver injury, known as regenerative nodules. One way to categorize benign liver tumors is by their anatomic source, such as hepatocellular, biliary, or stromal.

==== Hemangiomas ====
Cavernous hemangiomas (also called hepatic hemangioma or liver hemangioma) are the most common type of benign liver tumor, found in 3%–10% of people. They are made up of blood clusters that are surrounded by endothelial cells. These hemangiomas get their blood supply from the hepatic artery and its branches. These tumors are most common in women. The cause of liver hemangiomas remains unknown; however, it may have congenital and genetic components. They are not known to become malignant based on the available existing literature.

Liver hemangiomas do not usually cause symptoms. They are usually small, with sizes up to 10 centimeters. Their size tends to remain stable overtime. However, if the hemangioma is large it can cause abdominal pain, a sense of fullness in right upper abdominal area, heart problems, and coagulation dysfunction. Cavernous hemangiomas are diagnosed with medical imaging (do not usually need biopsy to confirm diagnosis).

Given their benign course and often asymptomatic nature, cavernous hemangiomas are typically diagnosed incidentally (e.g. when medical imaging is obtained for another reason). In terms of management, they are usually monitored with periodic imaging as well as more closely if the person becomes pregnant. If the cavernous hemangioma grows quickly or the patient is symptomatic, further medical intervention is warranted. Therapies include open or laparoscopic surgical resection, arterial embolization, or radio-frequency ablation. In terms of complications of hepatic hemangiomas, it is very rare for a hepatic hemangioma to rupture or bleed.

==== Focal nodular hyperplasia ====
Focal nodular hyperplasia (FNH) is the second most common benign tumor of the liver. FNH is found in 0.2%–0.3% of adults worldwide. FNH is more common in females (10:1 female to male ratio) except in Japan and China, in which there is a more equal prevalence of cases between females and males. FNH is associated with women of childbearing years and has been associated with women taking hormonal oral contraceptives. This tumor is the result of a congenital arteriovenous malformation hepatocyte response. This process is one in which all normal constituents of the liver are present, but the pattern by which they are presented is abnormal.

These tumors usually do not have any symptoms. If large, they may present with abdominal pain. It is common for patients to have multiple distinct liver lesions; however, they do not tend to grow over time and they do not typically convert to malignant tumors. Diagnosis is made mainly with medical imaging, such as ultrasound or MRI with contrast. The majority of FNH have a characteristic "central scar" on contrast-enhanced imaging, which helps to solidify the diagnosis. However, if a central scar is not present on imaging, it is hard to tell the difference between FNH, hepatic adenoma, and hepatocellular carcinoma, in which cases biopsy is the next step to aid in the diagnosis process.

Given the benign nature of FNH and the fact that they rarely progress in size or undergo malignant transformation, FNH tumors are usually managed with clinical monitoring. Surgical indications or arterial embolization for FNH include if the FNH lesion is large, symptomatic, or there is uncertainty surrounding the correct diagnosis.

==== Hepatic adenoma ====
Hepatocellular adenomas (also called hepatocellular adenoma) are rare benign liver tumors made up of hepatocytes, with estimates indicating hepatocellular adenomas make up 2% of liver tumors. They are most common in women using contraceptives or hormone replacement therapies containing estrogen, women who are pregnant, or people mis-using steroids. They are also associated with glycogen storage diseases (subtypes I and III), and newer studies are suggesting that diabetes, obesity, high blood pressure, and dyslipidemia are risk factors for hepatic adenomas.

Hepatocellular adenomas are most often asymptomatic and often found incidentally on imaging. However, if signs and symptoms are present they include non-specific abdominal pain, yellowing of skin, and higher than normal gamma glutamyl transferase and alkaline phosphatase laboratory values. They are, in most cases, located in the right hepatic lobe and are frequently seen as a single lesion. Their size ranges from 1 to 30 cm. They can be difficult to diagnosis with imaging studies alone, because it can be hard to tell the difference between hepatocellular adenoma, focal nodular hyperplasia, and hepatocellular carcinoma. Molecular categorization via biopsy and pathological analysis aids in both diagnosis and understanding prognosis, particularly because hepatocellular adenomas have the potential to become malignant. Percutaneous biopsy should be avoided, because this method can lead to bleeding or rupture of the adenoma. The best way to biopsy suspected hepatic adenoma is via open or laparoscopic excisional biopsy.

Because hepatocellular adenomas are so rare, there are no clear guidelines for the best course of treatment. The complications, which include malignant transformation, spontaneous hemorrhage, and rupture, are considered when determining the treatment approach Estimates indicate approximately 20-40% of hepatocellular adenomas will undergo spontaneous hemorrhage. The evidence is not well elucidated, but the best available data suggests that the risk of hepatocellular adenoma becoming hepatocellular carcinoma, which is malignant liver tumor, is 4.2% of all cases. Transformation to hepatocellular carcinoma is more common in men. Currently, if the hepatic adenoma is >5 cm, increasing in size, symptomatic lesions, has molecular markers associated with HCC transformation, rising level of liver tumor markers such as alpha fetoprotein, the patient is a male, or has a glycogen storage disorder, the adenoma is recommended to be surgically removed. Like most liver tumors, the anatomy and location of the adenoma determines whether the tumor can removed laparoscopically or if it requires an open surgical procedure. Hepatocellular adenomas are also known to decrease in size when there is decreased estrogen or steroids (e.g. when estrogen-containing contraceptives, steroids are stopped, or post-partum).

Women of childbearing age with hepatic adenomas were previously recommended to avoid becoming pregnant altogether; however, currently a more individualized approach is recommended that takes into account the size of the adenoma and whether surgical resection is possible prior to becoming pregnant. Currently, there is a clinical trial called the Pregnancy and Liver Adenoma Management (PALM) study that is investigating management of hepatic adenomas during pregnancy; however, the results of this trial have not been published as of February 2021.

==== Liver Cell Adenomatosis ====
Liver cell adenomatosis (also called hepatic adenomatosis) is a related but distinct diagnosis from hepatocellular adenoma. On medical imaging and histopathological biopsy results they are the same as hepatic adenomas. Liver cell adenomatosis differs from hepatic adenomas by its definition of more than 10 hepatic adenomas that are in both liver lobes in a person who does not have a glycogen storage disease and is not taking exogenous hormones. Liver cell adenomatosis is not associated with steroid use (e.g. their size does not change when taking or not taking oral contraceptives containing estrogen or anabolic steroids), which is another distinction from hepatic adenomas. Liver cell adenomatosis is associated with liver dysfunction and higher rates of bleeding than hepatic adenomas alone. Available evidence suggests that bleeding occurs in approximately 63% of patients with liver cell adenomatosis. Liver cell adenomatosis is also associated with becoming hepatocellular carcinoma. Like hepatic adenomas, they are diagnosed with imaging and biopsies as needed. Treatment of liver cell adenomatosis is difficult due to the multiple, widespread lesions. Liver imaging should be reviewed to see if it is possible to surgically remove the tumors. Liver transplantation is a treatment option for some patients.

==== Simple Liver Cysts ====
Liver cysts are common. They are fluid-filled contained structures within the liver. Simple liver cysts are seen most commonly in women and kids. In terms of pathophysiology, they are formed in response to developmental events and in response to trauma and inflammation. In addition, liver cysts can be seen with polycystic kidney disease and echinococcosis infection (hydatid disease).

Pseudotumors:

Pseudotumors differ from liver tumors in that they are not a proliferation of abnormal cells but are "local variations" of tissue type. Notably, liver pseudotumors can be confused for a liver tumor on initial imaging studies when diagnostically working up a liver mass. Examples of pseudotumors include: distinct areas of hepatic fibrosis, pockets of fatty liver changes, and inflammatory pseudotumor.

=== Cancerous ===
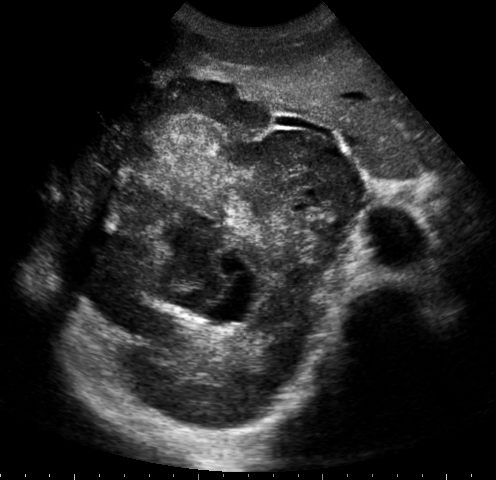
Large HCC filling almost entire of right lobe

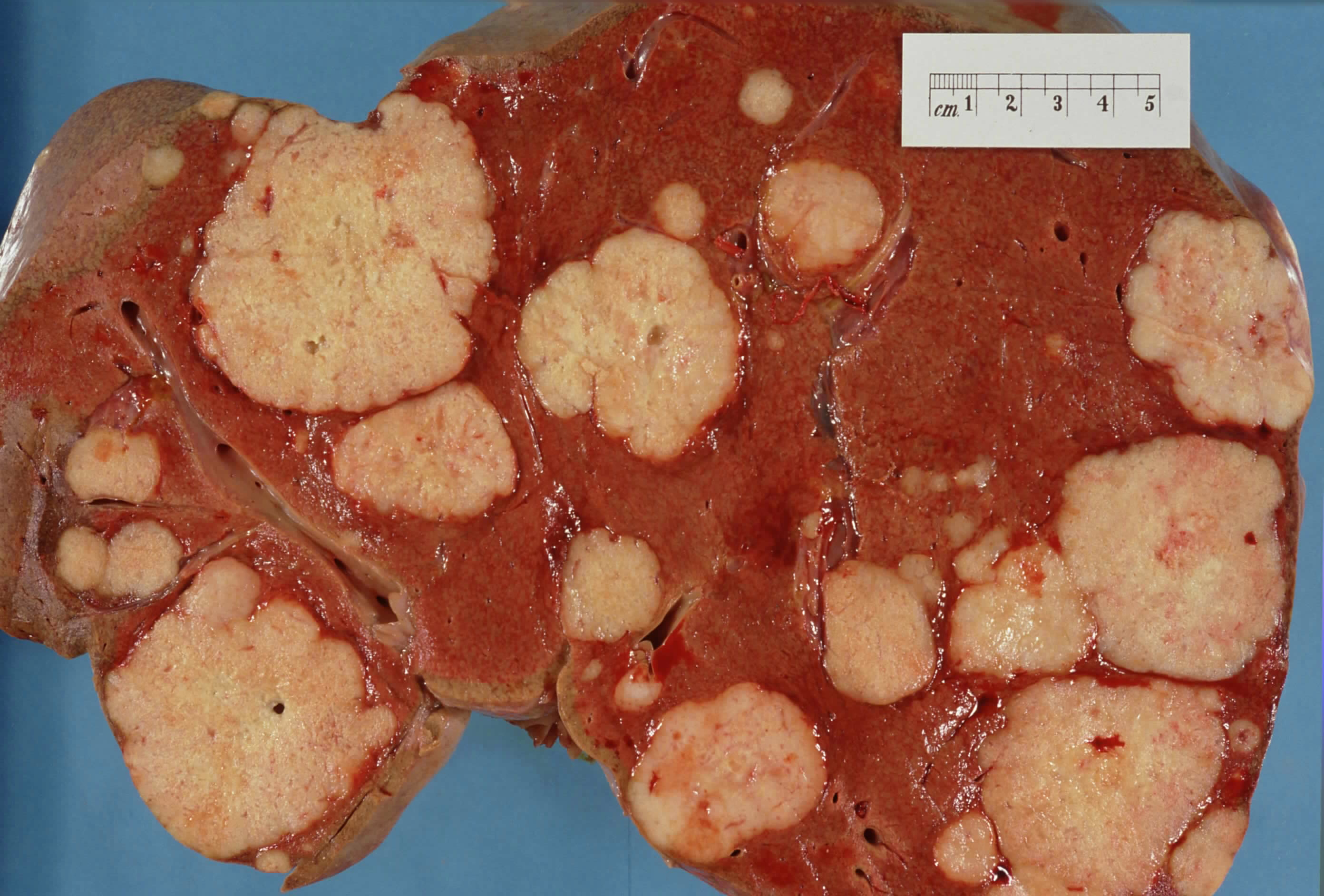
Cross section of a human liver, showing multiple large pale tumor deposits. The tumor is an adenocarcinoma derived from a primary lesion in the body of the pancreas.

- Most cases are metastases from other tumors, frequently of the GI tract (like colon cancer, carcinoid tumors mainly of the appendix, etc.), but also from breast cancer, ovarian cancer, lung cancer, renal cancer, prostate cancer, etc.
- The most frequent, malignant, primary liver cancer is hepatocellular carcinoma.
- Other forms of primary forms of liver cancer include cholangiocarcinoma, mixed tumors, sarcoma, and hepatoblastoma.

== Diagnosis ==
Upon discovery of a liver tumor, the main issue in the workup is to determine whether the tumor is benign or malignant. Many imaging modalities are used to aid in the diagnosis of malignant liver tumors. These include sonography (ultrasound), computed tomography (CT) and magnetic resonance imaging (MRI).

Tumor markers, chemicals sometimes found in the blood of people with cancer, can be helpful in diagnosing and monitoring the course of liver cancers. High levels of alpha-fetoprotein (AFP) in the blood can be found in many cases of HCC and intrahepatic cholangiocarcinoma. Cholangiocarcinoma can be detected with these commonly used tumor markers: carbohydrate antigen 19-9 (CA 19–9), carcinoembryonic antigen (CEA) and cancer antigen 125 (CA125). These tumour markers are found in primary liver cancers, as well as in other cancers and certain other disorders.

=== Ultrasound ===
Ultrasonography of liver tumors involves two stages: detection and characterization. Tumor detection is based on the performance of the method and should include morphometric information (three axes dimensions, volume) and topographic information (number, location specifying liver segment and lobe/lobes). The specification of these data is important for staging liver tumors and prognosis. Tumor characterization is a complex process based on a sum of criteria leading towards tumor nature definition. Often, other diagnostic procedures, especially interventional ones are no longer necessary. Tumor characterization using the ultrasound method will be based on the following elements: consistency (solid, liquid, mixed), echogenicity, structure appearance (homogeneous or heterogeneous), delineation from adjacent liver parenchyma (capsular, imprecise), elasticity, posterior acoustic enhancement effect, the relation with neighboring organs or structures (displacement, invasion), vasculature (presence and characteristics on Doppler ultrasonography and contrast-enhanced ultrasound (CEUS).

=== Computed tomography ===
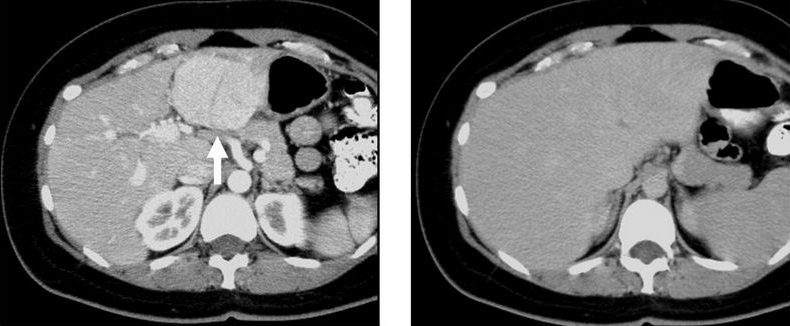
Selected images from a biphasic CT of Focal Nodular Hyperplasia in the left hepatic lobe (arrow). These masses have characteristic early arterial enhancement (6a) with contrast wash out on the portal venous phase images (6b) from the mass making these lesions difficult to identify on portal venous phase images alone.

When evaluating hepatic masses by abdominal computed tomography (CT), it can be advantageous to have both late arterial and portal venous phase images since some tumors enhance briskly during the arterial phase (hepatocellular carcinoma, hepatic adenoma, follicular nodular hyperplasia (FNH), and hypervascular metastasis), but maybe occult or difficult to characterize on portal venous phase imaging alone. However, it should be stressed that the addition of late arterial phase images is only indicated if one of these tumors is suspected, or if there is a need for further characterization of a hepatic mass, since the large majority of patients will not benefit from the addition of this phase. In addition, if there is a need to definitively characterize a hepatic mass, MRI is generally more sensitive and specific, with no associated radiation dose.
