= Glucose-6-phosphate exchanger SLC37A4 =

Human protein

SLC37A4

Identifiers
- Aliases: SLC37A4, G6PT1, G6PT2, G6PT3, GSD1b, GSD1c, GSD1d, TRG-19, TRG19, PRO0685, solute carrier family 37 member 4, CDG2W
- External IDs: OMIM: 602671; MGI: 1316650; GeneCards: SLC37A4

Gene location (Human)
Chr.	Chromosome 11 (human)
Band	11q23.3	Start	119,024,114 bp
Band	11q23.3	End	119,030,906 bp

Gene location (Mouse)
Chr.	Chromosome 9 (mouse)
Band	9|9 A5.2	Start	44,308,149 bp
Band	9|9 A5.2	End	44,314,265 bp
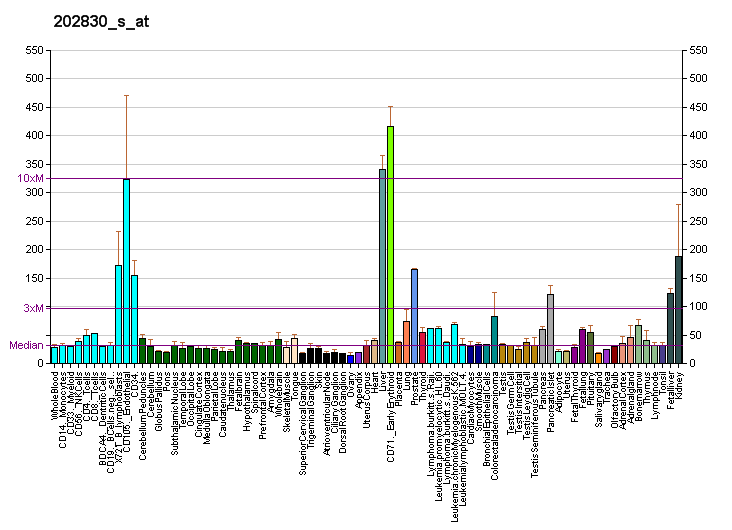

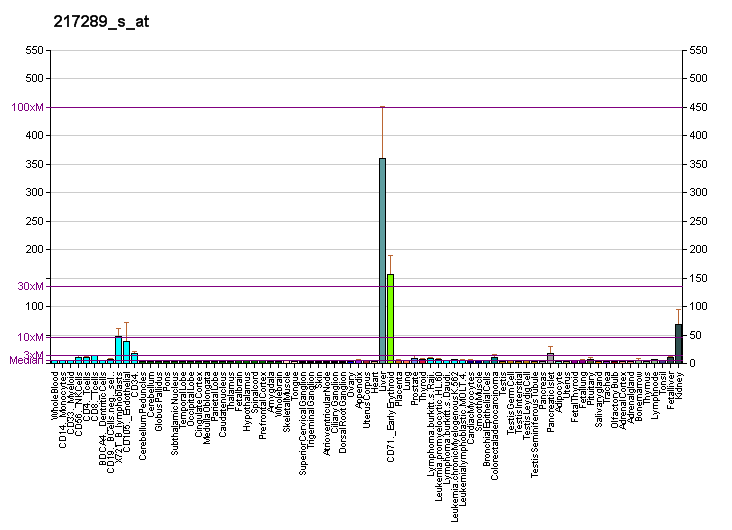
RNA expression pattern
Bgee	Human / Mouse (ortholog); Top expressed in: right lobe of liver; duodenum; body of pancreas; islet of Langerhans; renal cortex; human kidney; mucosa of transverse colon; gastrocnemius muscle; rectum; skeletal muscle tissue / Top expressed in: right kidney; vastus lateralis muscle; triceps brachii muscle; proximal tubule; human kidney; muscle of thigh; extensor digitorum longus muscle; left lobe of liver; sternocleidomastoid muscle; tibialis anterior muscle; More reference expression data
BioGPS	More reference expression data
Gene ontology
Molecular function	transporter activity; glucose-6-phosphate transmembrane transporter activity; glucose 6-phosphate:inorganic phosphate antiporter activity; antiporter activity; transmembrane transporter activity
Cellular component	integral component of membrane; membrane; integral component of endoplasmic reticulum membrane; endoplasmic reticulum; endoplasmic reticulum membrane
Biological process	glucose-6-phosphate transport; phosphate ion transmembrane transport; glucose metabolic process; glucose homeostasis; carbohydrate transport; transmembrane transport; gluconeogenesis; transport
Sources:Amigo / QuickGO
Orthologs
Databases	NCBI: entry; OMA: entry
Species	Human	Mouse
Entrez	2542	14385
Ensembl	ENSG00000137700; ENSG00000281500	ENSMUSG00000032114
UniProt	O43826	n/a
RefSeq (mRNA)	NM_001467; NM_001164277; NM_001164278; NM_001164279; NM_001164280	NM_001293630; NM_001293631; NM_008063; NM_001357729; NM_001357730 NM_001378829; NM_001378830; NM_001378831; NM_001378832; NM_001378833; NM_001378834
RefSeq (protein)	NP_001157749; NP_001157750; NP_001157751; NP_001157752; NP_001458	n/a
Location (UCSC)	Chr 11: 119.02 – 119.03 Mb	Chr 9: 44.31 – 44.31 Mb
PubMed search
- Wikidata
View/Edit Human	View/Edit Mouse

Glucose-6-phosphate exchanger SLC37A4, also known as glucose-6-phosphate translocase, is an enzyme that in humans is encoded by the SLC37A4 gene.

It consists of three subunits, each of which are vital components of the multi-enzyme Glucose-6-Phosphatase Complex (G6Pase). This important enzyme complex is located within the membrane of the endoplasmic reticulum, and catalyzes the terminal reactions in both glycogenolysis and gluconeogenesis. The G6Pase complex is most abundant in liver tissue, but also present in kidney cells, small intestine, pancreatic islets and at a lower concentration in the gallbladder. The G6Pase complex is highly involved in the regulation of homeostasis and blood glucose levels. Within this framework of glucose regulation, the translocase components are responsible for transporting the substrates and products across the endoplasmic reticulum membrane, resulting in the release of free glucose into the bloodstream.

== Structure ==
Glucose-6-phosphate translocase is a transmembrane protein providing a selective channel between the endoplasmic reticulum lumen and the cytosol. The enzyme is made up of three separate transporting subunits referred to as G6PT1 (subunit 1), G6PT2 (subunit 2) and G6PT3 (subunit 3). While the hydrolyzing component of the G6Pase complex is located on the side of the membrane on which it acts, namely facing the lumen, the translocases are all integral membrane proteins in order to perform their function as cross-membrane transporters. The translocases are spatially located on either side of the active site of the hydrolyzing component within the membrane, which allows the greatest speed and facility of the reaction.

== Mechanism ==
Each of the translocase subunits performs a specific function in the transport of substrates and products, and finally release of glucose (which will eventually reach the bloodstream), as a step in glycogenolysis or gluconeogenesis. G6PT1 transports Glucose-6-Phosphate from the cytosol into the lumen of the endoplasmic reticulum, where it is hydrolyzed by the catalytic subunit of G6Pase. After hydrolysis, glucose and inorganic phosphate are transported back into the cytosol by G6PT2 and G6PT3, respectively. While the exact chemistry of the enzyme remains unknown, studies have shown that the mechanism of the enzyme complex is highly dependent upon the membrane structure. For instance, the Michaelis Constant of the enzyme for glucose-6-phosphate decreases significantly upon membrane disruption. The originally proposed mechanism of the G6Pase system involved a relatively unspecific hydrolase, suggesting that G6PT1 alone provides the high specificity for the overall reaction by selective transport into the lumen, where hydrolysis occurs. Supporting evidence for this proposed reaction includes the marked decrease in substrate specificity of hydrolysis upon membrane degradation.

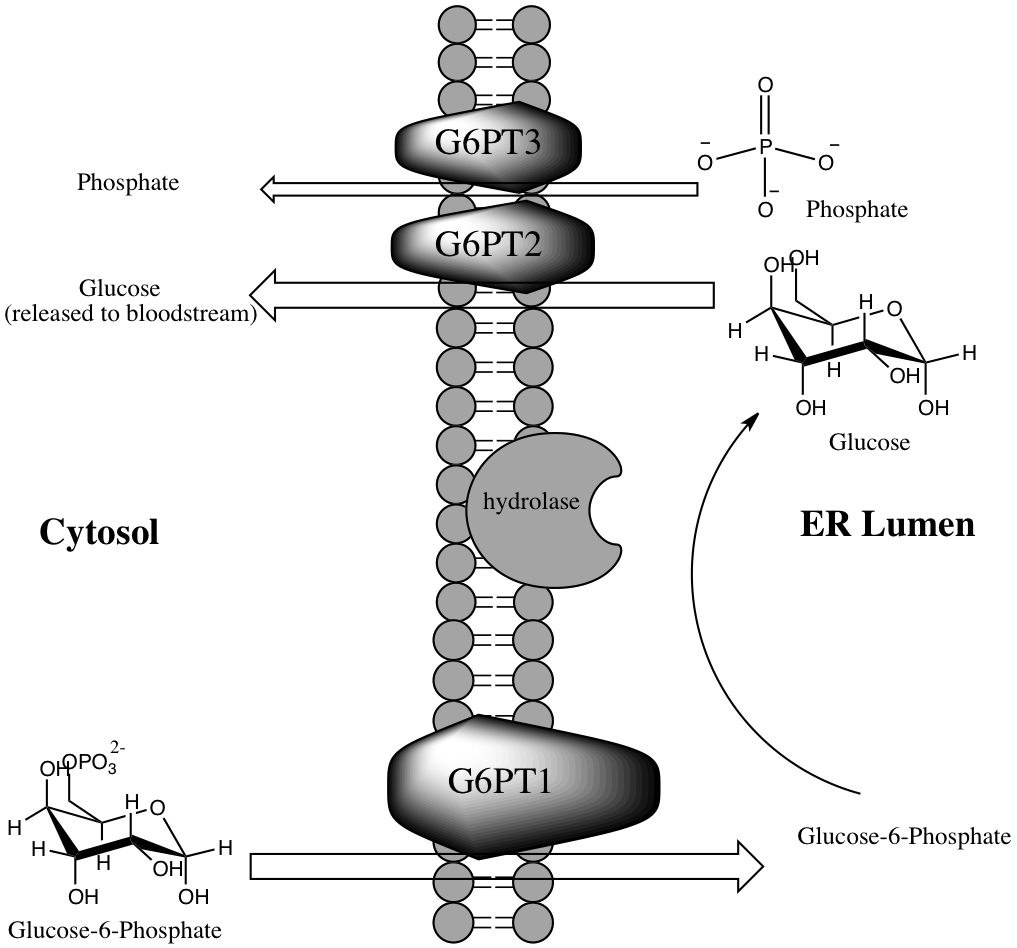
Figure 1: Schematic representation of Glucose-6-Phosphate Translocase within the Glucose-6-Phosphatase Complex

Figure 1 illustrates the role of G6P-Translocase within the G6Pase complex.

== Inhibitors ==
Many inhibitors of glucose-6-phosphate translocase of novel, semi-synthetic or natural origin are known and of medical importance. Genetic algorithms for synthesizing novel inhibitors of G6PT1 have been developed and utilized in drug discovery. Inhibitors of G6PT1 are the most studied as this subunit catalyzes the rate limiting step in glucose production through gluconeogenesis or glycogenolysis, and without its function these two processes could not occur. This inhibition holds great potential in drug development (discussed in "Medical and Disease Relevance"). Small-molecule inhibitors, such as mercaptopicolinic acid and diazobenzene sulfonate have some degree of inhibiting potential for G6PT1 but systematically lack specificity in inhibition, rendering them poor drug candidates. Since the late 1990s, natural products have been increasingly studied as potent and specific inhibitors of G6PT1. Prominent examples of natural inhibitors include mumbaistatin and analogs, kodaistatin (harvested from extracts of Aspergillus terreus) and chlorogenic acid. Other natural product inhibitors of G6PT1 are found in the fungi Chaetomium carinthiacum, Bauhinia magalandra leaves, and streptomyces bacteria.

== Medical and disease relevance ==
1) Excessive activity of G6PT1 may contribute to the development of diabetes. Diabetes mellitus type 2 is a disease characterized by chronically elevated blood glucose levels, even when fasting. The rapidly rising prevalence of type 2 diabetes, along with its strong correlation to heart disease and other health complications has rendered it an area of intense research with an urgent need for treatment options. Studies monitoring blood glucose levels in rabbits revealed that the activity of G6Pase, and therefore G6PT1, is increased in specimens with diabetes. This strong correlation with diabetes type 2 makes the G6Pase complex, and G6PT1 in particular, an appealing drug target for control of blood glucose levels as its inhibition would directly prevent the release of free glucose into the bloodstream. It is possible that this mechanism of inhibition could be developed into a treatment for diabetes.

2) The absence of a functional G6PT1 enzyme causes glycogen storage disease type Ib, commonly referred to as von Gierke disease, in humans. A common symptom of this disease is a build-up of glycogen in the liver and kidney causing enlargement of the organs.

3) G6PT1 activity contributes to the survival of cells during hypoxia, which enables tumor cell growth and proliferation.

== See also ==
- Solute carrier family
