= Ultrasonography of liver tumors =

- Purpose: detection and characterization of hepatic tumors

Ultrasonography of liver tumors involves two stages: detection and characterization.

Tumor detection is based on the performance of the method and should include morphometric information (three axes dimensions, volume) and topographic information (number, location specifying liver segment and lobe/lobes). The specification of these data is important for staging liver tumors and prognosis.

Tumor characterization is a complex process based on a sum of criteria leading towards tumor nature definition. Often, other diagnostic procedures, especially interventional ones are no longer necessary. Tumor characterization using the ultrasound method will be based on the following elements: consistency (solid, liquid, mixed), echogenicity, structure appearance (homogeneous or heterogeneous), delineation from adjacent liver parenchyma (capsular, imprecise), elasticity, posterior acoustic enhancement effect, the relation with neighboring organs or structures (displacement, invasion), vasculature (presence and characteristics on Doppler ultrasonography and contrast-enhanced ultrasound (CEUS).

The substrate on which the tumor condition develops (if the liver is normal or if there is evidence of diffuse liver disease) and the developing context (oncology, septic) are also added. Particular attention should be paid to the analysis of the circulatory bed. Microcirculation investigation allows for discrimination between benign and malignant tumors. Characteristic elements of malignant circulation are vascular density, presence of vessels with irregular paths and size, some of them intercommunicating, some others blocked in the end with "glove finger" appearance, the presence of arterio-arterial and arterio-venous shunts, lack or incompetence of arterial precapillary sphincter made up of smooth musculatures. Diagnosis and characterization of liver tumors require a distinct approach for each group of conditions, using the available procedures discussed above for each of them. The correlation with the medical history, the patient's clinical and functional (biochemical and hematological) status are important elements that should also be considered.

== Benign liver tumors ==
Benign liver tumors generally develop on normal or fatty liver, are single or multiple (generally paucilocular), have distinct delineation, with increased echogenity (hemangiomas, benign focal nodular hyperplasia) or absent, with posterior acoustic enhancement effect (cysts), have distinct delineation (hydatid cyst), lack of vascularization or show a characteristic circulatory pattern, displace normal liver structures and even neighboring organs (in case of large sizes), are quite elastic and do not invade liver vessels. The patient has a good general status, as tumors are often asymptomatic, being incidentally discovered.

=== Liver cysts ===
They can be single or multiple, with variable size, generally less than 20 mm (congenital). Rarely, sizes can reach several centimeters, leading up to the substitution of a whole liver lobe (acquired, parasitic). They may be associated with renal cysts; in this case the disease has a hereditary, autosomal dominant transmission (von Hippel Lindau disease).

The ultrasound appearance is a well defined lesion, with very thin, almost unapparent walls, without circulatory signal at Doppler or CEUS investigation. The content is transonic suggesting fluid composition. The presence of membranes, abundant sediment or cysts inside is suggestive for parasitic, hydatid nature. Posterior from the lesion the acoustic enhancement phenomenon is seen, which strengthens the suspicion of fluid mass. They typically displace normal liver vessels but no vascular or biliary invasion occurs.

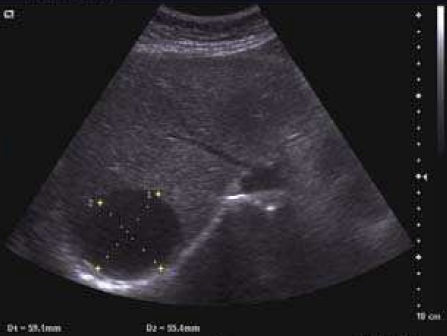
Liver cyst

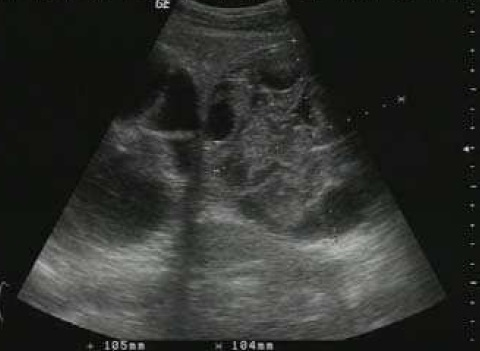
Hydatid liver cyst. Diagnostic criteria are the presence of membranes and sediment inside.

=== Hemangioma ===
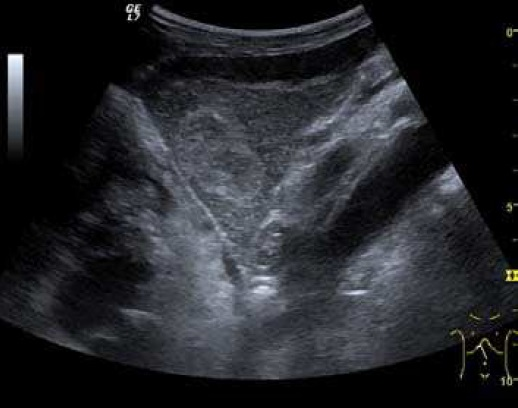
Hepatic hemangioma (2D). The lesion is located in the left hepatic lobe. Note precise delineation, their increased echogenity and the heterogeneous internal structure.

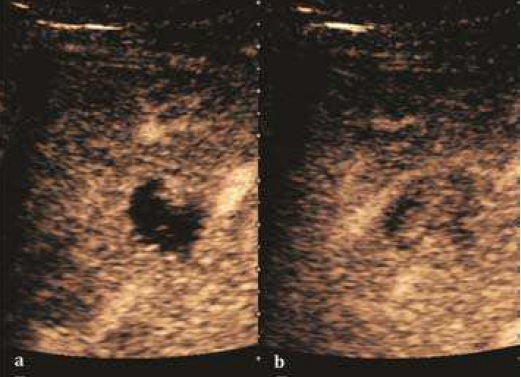
Hepatic hemangioma (CEUS). Progression of CA from the periphery toward the center of the lesion is evidenced by examination at various time intervals (a – arterial phase; b – late phase).

It is the most common liver tumor with a prevalence of 0.4 – 7.4%. It is generally asymptomatic but also can be associated with pain complaints or cytopenia and/or anemia when it is very bulky. It is unique or paucilocular. It can be associated with other types of benign liver tumors. Characteristic 2D ultrasound appearance is that of a very well defined lesion, with sizes of 2–3 cm or less, showing increased echogenity and, when located in contact with the diaphragm, a "mirror image" phenomenon can be seen. When palpating the liver with the transducer the hemangioma is compressible sending reverberations backwards. Doppler exploration reveals no circulatory signal due to very slow flow speed. CEUS investigation has real diagnosis value due to the typical behavior of progressive CA enhancement of the tumor from the periphery towards the center. The enhancement is slow, during several minutes, depending on the size of hemangioma and on the presence (or absence) of internal thrombosis. During late (sinusoidal) phase, if totally "filled" with CA, hemangioma appears isoechoic to the liver. Deviations from the above described behavior can occur in arterialized hemangiomas or those containing arterio-venous shunts. In these cases, differentiation from a malignant tumor is difficult and requires other imaging procedures, follow up and measurements of the tumor at short time intervals.

=== Focal nodular hyperplasia ===
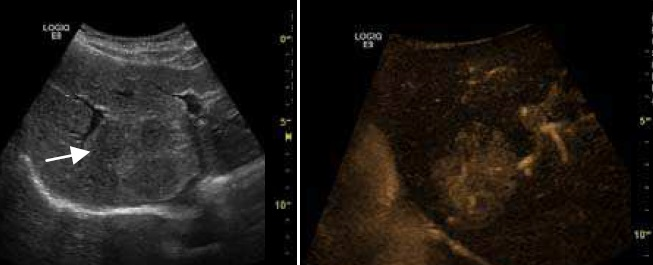
Benign focal nodular hyperplasia (CEUS). Gray scale examination (left) detects the lesion. CEUS examination (right) allows characterization of tumor nature based on central contrast enhancement and centrifugal dispersion.

It is a tumor developed secondary to a circulatory abnormality with abundant arterial vessels having a characteristic location in the center of the tumor, within a fibrotic scar. A radial vessels network develops from this level with peripheral orientation. The tumor's circulatory bed is rich in microcirculatory and portal venous elements. The incidence is higher in younger women and tumor development is accelerated by oral contraceptives intake. 2D ultrasound appearance is a fairly well-defined mass, with variable sizes, usually single, solid consistency with inhomogeneous structure. Rarely the central scar can be distinguished. Spectral Doppler examination detects central arterial vessels and CFM exploration reveals their radial position. CEUS examination shows central tumor filling of the circulatory bed during arterial phase and completely enhancement during portal venous phase. During this phase the center of the lesion becomes hypoechoic, enhancing the tumor scar. During the late phase the tumor remains isoechoic to the liver, which strengthens the diagnosis of benign lesion.

=== Adenoma ===
It is a benign tumor made up of normal or atypical hepatocytes. It has an incidence of 0.03%. Its development is induced by intake of anabolic hormones and oral contraceptives. The tumor is asymptomatic but may be associated with right upper quadrant pain in case of internal bleeding. 2D ultrasound shows a well-defined, un-encapsulated, solid mass. It may have a heterogeneous structure in case of intratumoral hemorrhage. Doppler examination shows no circulatory signal. CEUS exploration is quite ambiguous and cannot always establish a differential diagnosis with hepatocellular carcinoma. Thus, during the arterial phase there is a centripetal and inhomogeneous enhancement. During the portal venous phase there is a moderate wash out. During late phase the appearance is isoechoic or hypoechoic, due to lack of Kupffer cells.

== Malignant liver tumors ==
Malignant liver tumors develop on cirrhotic liver (hepatocellular carcinoma, HCC) or normal liver (metastases). They are single or multiple (especially metastases), have a variable, generally imprecise delineation, may have a very pronounced circulatory signal (hepatocellular carcinoma and some types of metastases), have a heterogeneous structure (the result of intratumoral circulatory disorders, consequence of hemorrhage or necrosis) and are firm to touch, even rigid. The patient's general status correlates with the underlying disease (vascular and parenchymal decompensation for liver cirrhosis, weight loss, lack of appetite and anemia with cancer).

=== Hepatocellular carcinoma (HCC) ===
It is the most common liver malignancy. It develops secondary to cirrhosis therefore, ultrasound examination every 6 months combined with alpha fetoprotein (AFP) determination is an effective method for early detection and treatment monitoring for this type of tumor . Clinically, HCC overlaps with advanced liver cirrhosis (long evolution, repeated vascular and parenchymal decompensation, sometimes bleeding due to variceal leakage) in addition to accelerated weight loss in the recent past and lack of appetite.

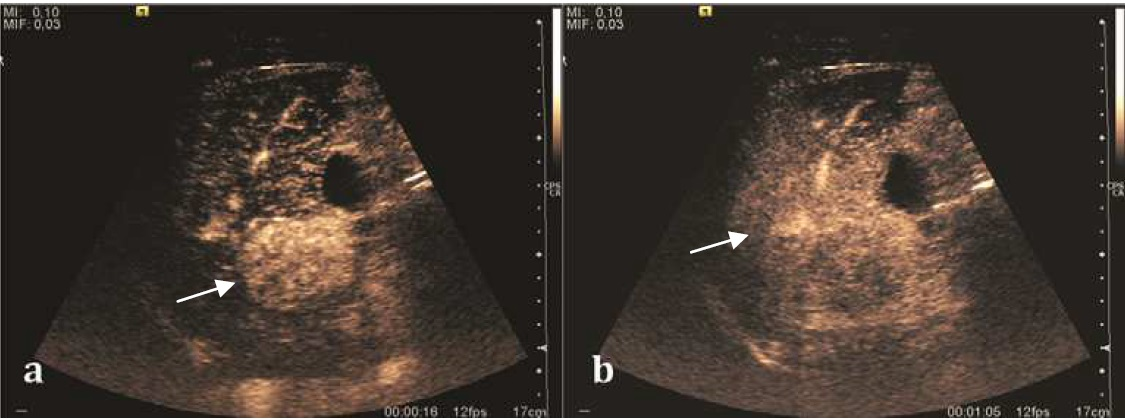
Encephaloid hepatocellular carcinoma (CEUS). Contrast tumor enhancement is observed on the left during arterial phase. The “wash-out” phenomenon can be seen on the right, during portal venous phase.

HCC appearance on 2D ultrasound is that of a solid tumor, with imprecise delineation, with heterogeneous structure, uni- or multilocular (encephaloid form). An "infiltrative" type is also described which is difficult to discriminate from liver nodular reconstruction in cirrhosis. Typically HCC invades liver vessels, primarily the portal veins but also the hepatic veins . Doppler examination detects a high speed arterial flow and low impedance index (correlated with described changes in tumor angiogenesis). The spatial distribution of the vessels is irregular, disordered. CEUS examination shows hyperenhancement of the lesion during the arterial phase. During the portal venous phase there is a specific "wash out" of ultrasound contrast agent (UCA) and the tumor appears hypoechoic during the late phase. Poorly differentiated tumors may have a stronger wash out leading to an isoechoic appearance to the liver parenchyma during portal venous phase. This appearance was found in approx. 30% of cases. The described changes have diagnostic value in liver nodules larger than 2 cm.

Ultrasound is useful in HCC detection, stadialization and assessing therapeutic efficacy. In terms of staging related to therapy effectiveness, the Barcelona classification is used which identifies five HCC stages. Curative therapy is indicated in early stages, which include very early stage (single nodule <2 cm), curable by surgical resection (survival 50-70% five years after surgical resection) and early stage (single nodule of 2–5 cm, or up to 3 nodules <3 cm) which can be treated by radiofrequency ablation (RFA) and liver transplantation. Intermediate stage (polinodular, without portal invasion) and advanced stage (N1, M1, with portal invasion) undergo palliative therapies (TACE and sorafenib systemic therapy) and in the end stage only symptomatic therapy applies.

=== Cholangiocarcinoma ===
It develops on non cirrhotic liver. 2D ultrasound appearance is uncharacteristic – solid mass with heterogeneous structure, poorly delineated, often with peripheral location and weak Doppler circulation signal. CEUS examination reveals a moderate enhancement of the tumor periphery during arterial phase followed by wash-out during portal venous phase and hypoechoic appearance during late phase.

=== Liver metastases ===
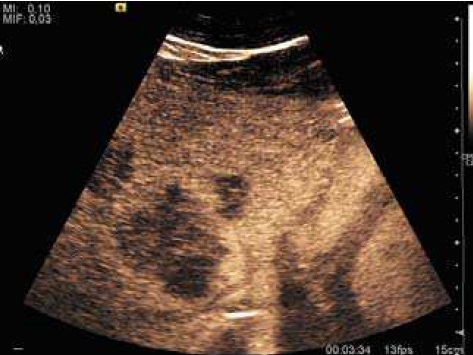
Peripheral vascular pattern of the lesion is observed in colon cancer metastasis (CEUS).

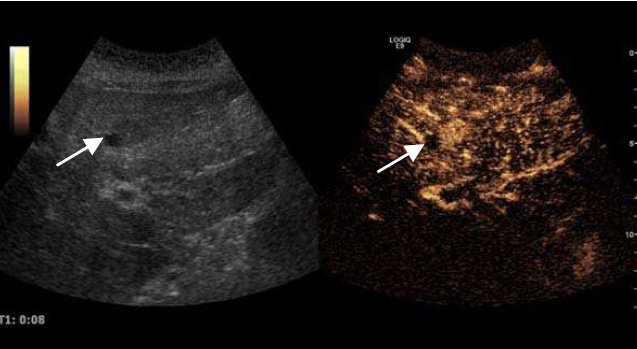
Lesion hyperenhancement in ovarian cancer liver metastasis is seen during the arterial phase.

US examination is required to detect liver metastases in patients with oncologic history. In addition, the method can incidentally detect metastases in asymptomatic patients. Early identification (small sizes, small number) is important to establish an optimal course of treatment which can be complex (chemotherapy, radiofrequency ablation, surgical resection) but welcomed. In addition, discrimination of synchronous lesions that have a different nature is also important knowing that up to 25–50% of liver lesions less than 2 cm detected in cancer patients may be benign . US sensitivity for metastases detection varies depending on the examiner's experience and the equipment used and ranges between 40 and 80% . Sensitivity is conditioned by the size and acoustic impedance of the nodules. For a lesion diameter below 10 mm US accuracy is greatly reduced, reaching approx. 20%. Other elements contributing to lower US performance are: excessive obesity, fatty liver disease, hypomobility of the diaphragm, and certain patterns of hyperechoic or isoechoic metastases that can be overlooked or can mimic benign conditions. Conventional US appearance of metastases is uncharacteristic, consisting of circumscribed lesions, with clear, imprecise or "halo" delineation, with homogeneous or heterogeneous echo pattern. They can be single (often liver metastases from colonic neoplasm) or multiple. Echogenity is variable. When increased, they can compress the bile ducts (which may be dilated) and the liver vessels. Liver involvement can be segmental, lobar or generalized. In this situation a pronounced hepatomegaly occurs. Generally, metastases have non-characteristic Doppler vascular pattern, with few exceptions (carcinoid metastases). Cyst-adenocarcinoma metastases due to semifluid content may have a transonic appearance. When increasing, they can result in central necrosis. CEUS examination is a real breakthrough for detection and characterization of liver metastases.

Increased performance is based on identifying specific vascular patterns during the arterial phase and seeing metastases in contrast to normal liver parenchyma during the sinusoidal phase. CEUS increased accuracy is due to the different behavior of normal liver parenchyma (captures CA in Kuppfer cells) against tumor parenchyma (does not contain Kuppfer cells, therefore CEUS appearance is hypoechoic). To this adds the particularities of intratumoral circulation represented by a reduced arterial bed compared to that of the surrounding normal liver and the absence of the portal vessels . In terms of vascularity, metastases can be hypovascular (in gastric, colonic, pancreatic or ovarian adenocarcinomas) with hypoechoic pattern during arterial phase, and similar during portal venous and late phases, respectively hypervascular (neuroendocrine tumors, melanoma, sarcomas, renal, breast or thyroid tumors) with hyperechoic appearance during arterial phase, with washout during the portal venous phase and hypoechoic pattern 30 seconds after injection.

Using CEUS examination to detect metastases a sensitivity of 80–95% is obtained, similar to that of contrast CT and MRI . Intraoperative use of the procedure increases its performance even if it does not have a decisive contribution to change the therapeutic behavior . Limitations of the method are those related to US penetration (pronounced fatty liver disease, deep lesion, excessive obesity) and to the experience of the examiner. To this the risk of confusion between hypervascular metastases, hepatocellular carcinoma and hemangioma and the confusion between hypovascular metastases and small liver cysts is added. Routine use of CEUS examination to detect liver metastases is recommended when conventional US examination is not conclusive, when precise information on some injuries (number, location) is necessary in conjunction with contrast CT/MRI and to assess the effectiveness of treatment when using an antiangiogenic therapy for hypervascular metastases . The method cannot replace CT/MRI examinations which have well established indications in oncology.

== Pseudotumors and inflammatory masses of the liver ==
Besides the entities listed above inflammatory masses or even pseudo-masses can occur. Their diagnosis is quite difficult and the criteria used for differentiation are often insufficient, requiring morphologic diagnostic procedures, use of other diagnostic imaging methods or patient reevaluation from time to time. This includes lesions developed on liver parenchyma reconstruction, as occurs in cirrhosis, steatosis accumulation or in case of acute or chronic inflammatory diseases.

=== Focal steatosis ===
It consists of localized accumulation of fat-rich liver cells. In some cases this accumulation can mimic a liver tumor. Sometimes the opposite phenomenon can be seen, that is an "island" of normal parenchyma in a “shining” liver. In both cases ultrasound examination identifies a well defined, un-encapsulated area, with echostructure and vasculature similar to those of normal liver parenchyma. The lesion can have different forms, most cases being oval and located in the IVth segment, anterior from the hepatic hilum. It occurs in dyslipidemic or alcohol intake patients with normal physical and biological status. Benign diagnosis confirmation is made using CEUS examination which proves a normal circulatory bed similar to adjacent liver parenchyma in all three phases of investigation.

=== Liver abscess ===
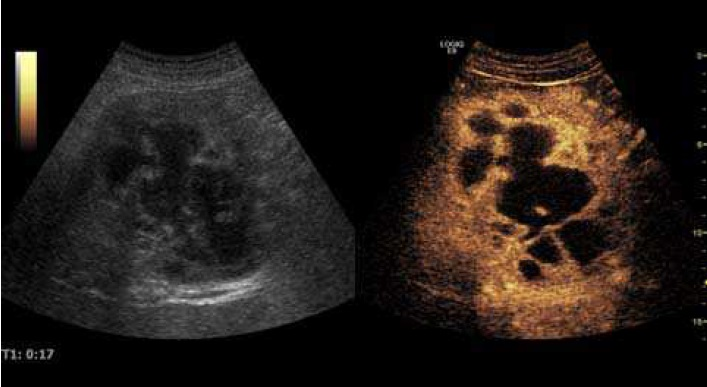
Liver abscess (2D and CEUS). 2D Examination reveals the fluid nature of the mass and imprecise delineation. CEUS examination shows congestion in the surrounding liver parenchyma and excludes a vascular tumor.

Liver abscess have heteromorphic ultrasound appearance, the most typical being that of a mass with irregular shapes, fringed, with fluid or semifluid content, with or without air inside. Doppler examination shows the lack of vessels within the lesion. CEUS exploration shows hyperenhancement during arterial phase close to the lesion, this being suggestive of a liver parenchymal hyperemia. During venous and sinusoidal phase the pattern is hypoechoic, and the central fluid is contrast enhanced. CEUS examination is useful because it confirms the clinical suspicion of abscess. In addition, it allows for an accurate measurement of the collection size and an indication regarding its topography inside the liver (lobe, segment).

== Preneoplastic status. Cirrhotic liver monitoring ==
Cirrhotic liver is characterized by the occurrence of nodules with different sizes and evolution degrees, so that regenerative nodules, dysplastic nodules and even early hepatocellular carcinoma can coexist at some moment during disease progression. There are studies showing that between 59 and 94% of newly diagnosed liver nodules in cirrhotic patients have malignant histology and up to 50% of hyperechoic lesions, with ultrasound appearance of hemangioma, ultimately prove to be hepatocellular carcinoma. Therefore, current practice in many centers considers that any new lesion revealed in a cirrhotic patient should be regarded as malignant until otherwise proven. There are three categories of cirrhotic liver nodules: regenerative, dysplastic (considered as premalignant conditions) and tumoral (HCC).

=== Regenerative nodules (RN) ===
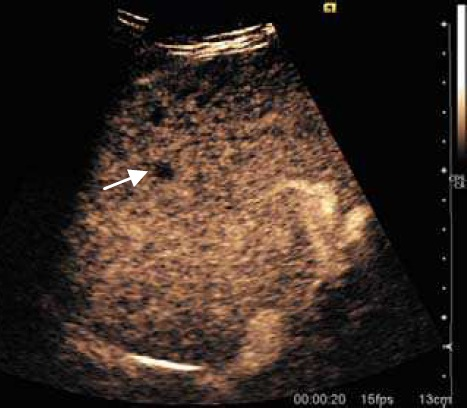
Regenerative nodule (CEUS). One can see the hypovascular pattern of the solid nodule, with a size <10 mm.

These lesions are well defined, with isoechoic or hypoechoic appearance and sizes less than 1 cm. They are high in numbers and have a more or less uniform distribution, involving all liver segments. They can crowd resulting in large pseudo tumors. At Doppler examination, these nodules have no circulatory signal. CEUS exploration is indicated when a nodule is different against the general pattern of restructured liver either by different echogenity or by a different size than the majority of nodules. During the arterial phase, the signal is weak or absent. During the portal venous and late phase, the appearance is persistently isoechoic.

Generally, RN is not distinct from the surrounding parenchyma. CEUS examination is useful to exclude an active lesion at the moment of exploration but does not have absolute prognostic value; therefore the patient should be periodically examined at short intervals. Correlation with clinical status and AFP measurements is required.

=== Dysplastic nodules (DN) ===
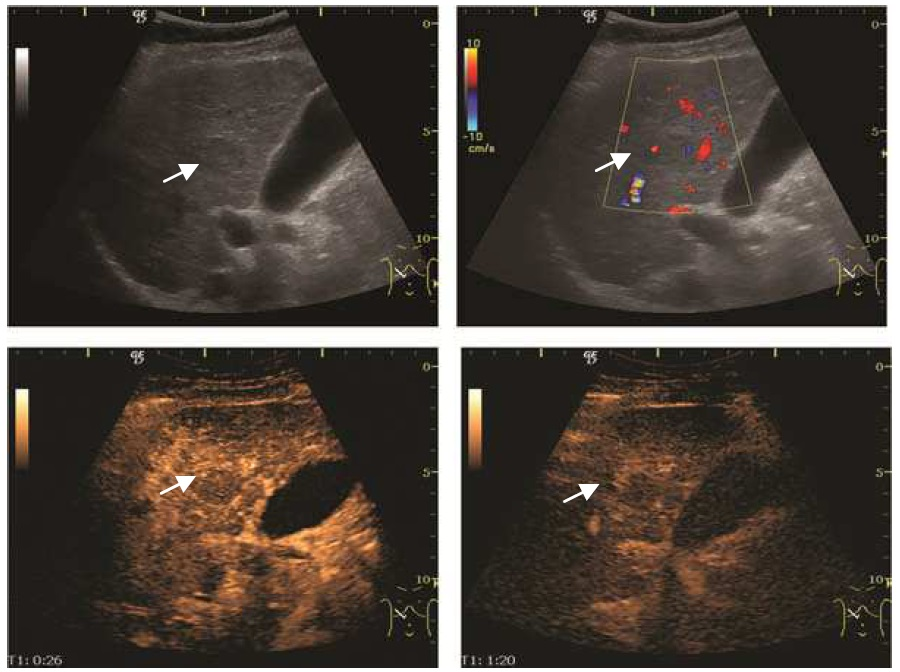
Dysplastic nodule (2D, CFM, CEUS). The nodule is well-defined with a size between 10– 20 mm, lacks vessels in CFM and CEUS exploration.

These lesions have various patterns (hypo or hyperechoic) with at least 1 cm diameter. They are hepatocytes with dysplastic changes, but without clear histological criteria for malignancy. They are divided into low-grade dysplastic nodules, where cellular atypia are mild and high-grade dysplastic nodules with moderate or severe cellular atypia, but without any established signs of malignancy. Occasionally, well-differentiated HCC foci can be identified in high-grade dysplastic nodules (appearance called "nodule in nodule") . Most authors accept the carcinogenesis process as a progressive transformation of DN from low-grade to high-grade and into HCC. The nodule's vasculature changes progressively, correlated with the degree of malignancy, and it is characterized by decrease until absence of portal venous input and by increase of arterial intratumoral input. Neoformation vessels occur with increasing degree of dysplasia. Arterial neovascularization is enhanced in a chaotic and explosive way, while normal, arterial and portal vasculature continues to decline. High-grade dysplastic nodules are hypovascularized both arterial and portal phases, while early HCC nodules may have similar arterial pattern with the surrounding parenchyma or exacerbated, and portal hypovascularization. In moderate or poorly differentiated HCC (classic HCC) tumor nutrition is performed only by neoformation vessels (abundant), the normal arterial and portal vasculature completely disappearing. This behavior of intratumoral vascularization is typical for HCC and is the key to imaging diagnosis.

B-mode ultrasonography is unable to distinguish between regenerative nodules and borderline lesions such as dysplastic nodules and even early HCC. Doppler examination also has a low sensitivity in differentiating dysplastic nodules from early HCC. Doppler signal may be absent in both regenerative and dysplastic nodules. Some authors indicate the presence of venous type Doppler flow which reflects the portal venous nutrition of the nodule as a characteristic feature of dysplastic nodules and early HCC (Minami & Kudo, 2010). Other authors noticed the presence of an arterial flow with small frequency variations and a normal resistivity index. On CEUS examination both RN and DN may have quite a variable enhancement pattern. Generally, both nodules enhances identically with the surrounding liver parenchyma after UCAs injection. Dysplastic nodules are hypovascular in the arterial phase. In case of highgrade dysplastic nodule sometimes a hypervascularization can be detected, but without associating "wash out" during portal and late CEUS phases. In these cases, biopsy may clarify the diagnosis.

=== Early hepatocellular carcinoma (Early HCC) ===
The suggestive appearance of early HCC on 2D ultrasound examination is that of hypoechoic nodule, with distinct pattern, developed on cirrhotic liver. Hypoechoic appearance is characteristic of moderate/poorly differentiated HCC, with low or absent fatty changes. Rarely, HCC may appear isoechoic, consist of a tumor type with a higher degree of differentiation and therefore with slower development. Another common aspect is "bright loop" or "nodule-in-nodule" appearance, hypoechoic nodules in a hyperechoic tumor.

Spectral Doppler characteristics of early HCC overlap those of the dysplastic nodule, as they are represented by the presence of portal venous signal type or arterial type with normal RI (well differentiated HCC) or increased RI (moderately or poorly differentiated HCC). The CFM exploration identifies a chaotic vessels pattern.

On CEUS examination, early HCC has an iso- or hypervascular appearance during the arterial phase followed by wash out during portal venous and late phase. There are studies showing that the wash out process is directly correlated with the size and features of neoplastic circulatory bed. Thus, highly differentiated HCC illustrates the phenomenon of late or even very late "wash out" while poorly differentiated HCC has an accelerated wash out at the end of arterial phase. It is therefore mandatory to analyze all these three phases of CEUS examination for a proper characterization of liver nodules. Tumor wash out at the end of the arterial phase allows the HCC diagnosis with a predictability of 89.5%. Some authors consider that early pronounced contrast enhancement of a nodule within 1–2 cm developed on a cirrhotic liver is sufficient for HCC diagnosis. These results prove that for a correct characterization of the lesions it is necessary to extend the examination time to 5 minutes or even longer.

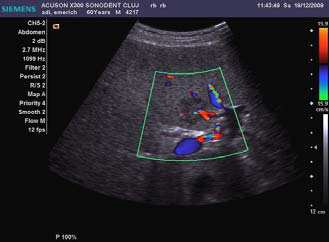
Fig. 11. Early hepatocellular carcinoma (2D, CFM). The 2D examination reveals a solid, hypoechoic nodule in IVth liver segment, without encapsulation. CFM shows a central vessel with ramifications to the periphery. The underlying liver is cirrhotic.

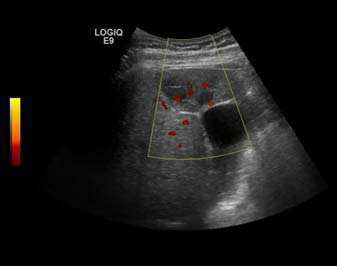
Fig. 12. Early hepatocellular carcinoma (2D, CFM). “Nodule in nodule” image: small hypoechoic early HCC inside monitored dysplastic nodule.

=== The ultrasound value in HCC "screening" ===
Baseline 2D ultrasound has an important role in surveillance programs for patients at risk to develop HCC. The examination has an acceptable sensitivity which increases with the tumor size. Sensitivity varies between 42% for lesions <1 cm and 95% for tumors larger than 1 cm, and specificity can reach 90%. Optimal time interval for ultrasound screening of “at risk” population is 6 months as it results from clinical trials that investigated the tumor size doubling time (Bruix, 2005; Maruyama et al., 2008). For a recently developed nodule the dimensional criteria will be taken into account. Thus, for a nodule with a size of less than 10 mm the patient will be reevaluated by ultrasound every 3 months, as the growth trend is an indication for completion of investigations with other diagnostic procedures; at a size between 10 – 20 mm two concordant imaging procedures are necessary, supplemented if necessary by an ultrasound guided biopsy; at a size over 20 mm one single dynamic imaging technique with characteristic appearance is enough for positive diagnostic. In uncertain cases complementary dynamic imaging techniques or biopsy should be performed. When Doppler exploration is not enough, CEUS examination will be performed. One should always keep in mind the risk of false positive results for HCC in case of cholangiocarcinomas so complementary diagnostic procedures should be considered.

The effectiveness of screening programs is proved by an increase in detection rate of HCC <2 cm (from <5% in the 90s in Europe to > 30% today in Japan) with curative therapy options. The main problem of ultrasound screening is that, in order to be cost-effective, it should be applied to the general population and not in tertiary hospitals. This raises the importance of the operator and equipment dependent part of the ultrasound examination. The efficiency of such a program is linked to the functional liver parenchyma of the cirrhotic patient. Therefore, some authors argue that screening should be excluded in patients with etiologies that prevent curative treatment or in patients with advanced liver disease (Child-Pugh class C).

After curative therapies (surgical resection, local ablative therapies) continuing ultrasound screening is recommended first at 1 month then at 3 months intervals after the therapy to assess the effectiveness of therapy and to detect other nodules.

== Antitumor therapies ==
Ultrasound exploration can be an effective procedure for the assessment of liver tumors response to treatment. Over the years, different criteria for assessing the effectiveness of curative or palliative therapies have been considered. Now it has been proved that the degree of tumor necrosis is not correlated with tumor diameter, therefore simple measurement of the tumor diameter (RECIST criteria) is not enough for therapy assessment.

Currently, local response to treatment is focused on tumor necrosis diagnosed by contrast dynamic imaging techniques and recognized by the presence of intratumoral non-enhanced areas. Local response to treatment is defined as: a. complete response, defined as complete disappearance of all known lesions (absence of tumor enhanced areas, reflecting total tumor necrosis) and absence of other new lesions determined by two observations not less than 4 weeks apart; b. partial response, defined as more than 50% reduction in total tumor enhancement in all measurable lesions, determined by two observations not less than 4 weeks apart c. stable disease (is not described by a, b, or d) d. progressive disease, defined as 25% increase in size of one or more measurable lesions or the appearance of new lesions.

=== Techniques for evaluating the efficiency of therapy ===
The efficiency of 2D ultrasound is low in assessing the effects of HCC or metastasis therapy, as it is unable to differentiate viable tumor tissue from post-therapy tumor necrosis.

However, it is able to detect the appearance of new lesions and to assess the occurrence of any complications of disease progression (ascites or portal vein thrombosis). Color Doppler ultrasound can be useful sometimes being able to show the presence of intratumoral vasculature as a sign of incomplete therapy or intratumoral recurrence. The absence of Doppler signal does not exclude the presence of viable tumor tissue. CEUS exploration, by its ability to enhance intra-lesion microcirculation, has proved its utility in monitoring therapeutic efficacy. Its indications are defined for HCC ablative treatments (pre, intra and post-therapy), while monitoring of systemic therapies of HCC and metastases are not validated indications at this time, but with proved efficacy in extensive clinical trials (Claudon et al., 2008). CEUS examination cannot completely replace the other imaging diagnostic methods currently in use because of the known limitations of the ultrasound method (operator/ equipment dependent, ultrasound examination limitations). In addition to bloating, in cancer patients post-therapy steatosis occurs, which prevent deep visibility. Spiral CT scan remains the method of choice in monitoring cancer therapies because it provides an overview of tumor extension and it is not limited by bloating or steatosis.

Gadolinium MRI examination is a procedure used more and more often, and its advantages are the absence of irradiation and its high sensitivity in tumor vasculature detection, especially in smaller tumors. However it remains an expensive and not a very accessible procedure, although it has a high specificity. Currently, CEUS and MRI are considered complementary methods to CT scan.

=== Ultrasound monitoring ablative therapies (alcoholization – PEI, radiofrequency ablation – RFA) ===
Ablative therapies are considered curative treatments for HCC together with surgical resection and liver transplantation and they are indicated for early tumor stages in patients with good liver function. Also they are successfully applied in the treatment of liver metastases, where surgical resection is contraindicated. They are chemical (intratumoral ethanol injection) or thermal (radiofrequency, laser or microwave ablation). They are applied in order to obtain a full therapeutic response, without affecting liver function. Complete response is locally proved by complete tumor necrosis with a safety margin around the tumor.

2D ultrasound, Doppler ultrasound and especially CEUS can play an important role in pretherapeutic staging, particularly when sectional imaging investigations (CT, MRI) provide uncertain results or are contraindicated. During the interventional procedure, ultrasound allows guidance of the needle into the tumor. CEUS allows guidance in areas of viable tissue and avoids intratumoral necrotic areas. CEUS also allows assessment of therapeutic effect immediately post-procedure (with the possibility of reintervention in case of partial response) . To accurately assess the effectiveness of treatment it is mandatory to compare the tumor diameter before therapy with the ablation area. The volume of damaged tissue must be higher than the initial tumor volume. CEUS appearance is that of central nonenhanced area showing a peripheral homogeneous hyperenhanced rim due to post-procedure inflammation. 24 hours after the procedure the inflammatory peripheral rim is thinning and the necrotic area appears larger than at the previous examination. Thus, a possible residual tumor may appear more evident. Residual tumor has poorly defined edges, irregular shape, and the tumor diameter is unchanged. Residual tumor tissue is evidenced at the periphery of the tumor as an eccentric area behaving as the original tumor at CEUS examination, with arterial hyperenhancement and portal and late wash-out. Ultrasound examination 24 hours after the procedure, including CEUS, can show apart from the character of the lesion any potential post-intervention complications (e.g. active bleeding).

In the first days after RFA both CEUS and spiral CT have low sensitivity in assessing therapeutic efficacy. CT sensitivity 24 hours post-therapy is reported to be even lower than CEUS. Difficulties in CEUS examination result from post-lesion hyperemia, presence of intratumoral air, ultrasound limitations (too deep lesion or the presence of fatty liver) or lack of patient's cooperation (immediately after therapy). For this reasons contrast imaging (CT or CEUS) control should be performed one month after ablation to confirm the result of the therapy.

Local recurrence is defined as recurrence of a hyperenhanced area at tumor periphery in the arterial phase, with portal and late wash-out. Sometimes, especially for HCC treated by alcoholization (PEI) hyperenhanced septa or vessels can be shown inside the lesion.

In case of successful treatment, US monitoring using CEUS is performed every three months. Although CE-CT and/or MRI are considered the method of choice in post-therapy monitoring, CEUS can be used in follow-up protocols, its diagnostic accuracy being equivalent to that of CE-CT or MRI.

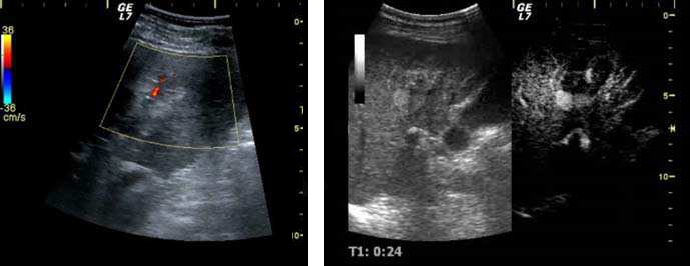
Fig. 13. Assessment of therapeutic efficacy on ultrasound (2D, CFM, CEUS). US exam shows vascular Doppler signal at CFM (left) and CEUS examination reveals incomplete therapy (right).

=== Ultrasound monitoring of TACE therapy (transarterial chemoembolization) ===
Transarterial chemoembolization (TACE) is part of palliative therapies for HCC used in intermediate stages of the disease. It consists of selective angiographic catheterization of the hepatic artery and injection of chemotherapeutic agents (usually adriamycin, but other molecules are currently the subject of clinical trials), followed by embolization of hepatic artery with gelfoam, alcohol or metal rings. A similar procedure is transarterial embolization but without chemotherapeutic agents injection, used in the treatment of hypervascular liver metastases. These therapies are based on the predominantly arterial vasculature of HCC and hypervascular metastases, while the remaining liver parenchyma has a dual vascular intake, predominantly portal. Their efficacy is high only for lesions who are hyperenhanced during arterial phase. The role of US is limited in the first few days after the procedure, and refers only to its complications, due to Lipiodol retention mainly intratumoral, but also diffusely intrahepatic. On ultrasound, Lipiodol appears intensely hyperechoic inside the tumor, with significant posterior attenuation which make US examination more difficult. On the other hand, CE-CT is also limited by the presence of Lipiodol (iodine oil), therefore the evaluation of therapeutic efficiency is currently made by indirect assessing Lipiodol binding to the tumor using nonenhanced CT. CE-MRI is not influenced by the presence of Lipiodol, but it is an expensive method and still difficult to reach. Several studies have proved similar efficacy, even superior, of CEUS compared to CE-CT and CE-MRI for the evaluation of post-TACE treatment results, while other studies have shown the limitations of CEUS especially for deep or small lesions. Given the CEUS limitations, currently some authors consider CT as standard method for the evaluation of TACE and local ablative therapies and CEUS and CE-MRI as complementary methods. Monitoring TACE therapeutic results by contrast imaging techniques is performed as for ablative therapies initially after one month then after every 3 months post-TACE.

Given that TACE is indicated only for hyperenhanced lesions during arterial phase, CEUS plays a very important role in monitoring the dysplastic nodules to identify the moment when changes occur in arterial vasculature, being able to have an early therapeutic intervention in order to limit tumor progression, to increase patient survival, and thus to create a bridge to liver transplantation.

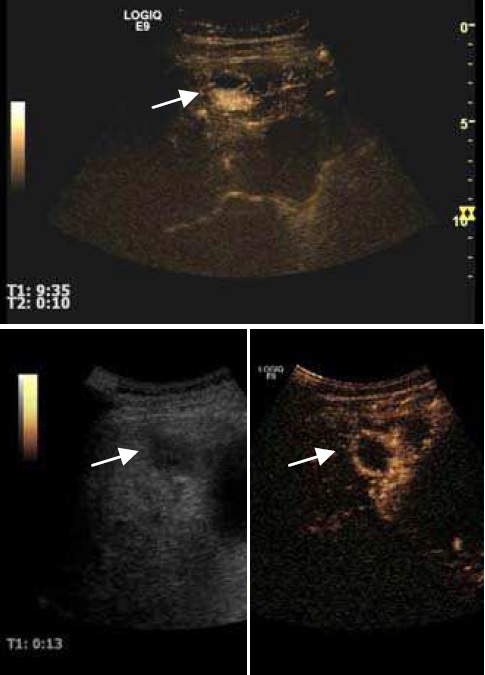
Fig. 14. Small HCC is seen at top (nodule in nodule). Efficient chemoembolization of the nodule (bottom). CEUS examination shows no circulatory signal within the nodule.

=== Ultrasound monitoring of systemic therapies ===
Systemic therapies are procedures based on the affinity of certain molecules to inhibit either tumor cell replication or multiplication of neoplastic vasculature (antiangiogenic therapies).

They are intravenously administered and are indicated in advanced stages of liver tumor diseases, when there are no other effective therapeutic solutions. Among ultrasound techniques, CEUS is the one that brought a significant benefit not only by increasing the sensitivity and specificity of ultrasound in detecting liver metastases, but also by assessing the efficacy of systemic therapy for HCC and metastases. The method has been adopted by oncologists since 2003 because it involves no irradiation and has no hepatic or renal toxicity, and it is now currently used in tumor therapeutic evaluation. It is currently used in large clinical trials aimed at determining the efficacy of different types of anti-angiogenic molecules by quantifying intratumoral perfusion based on the statistical analysis performed using specific software during post-processing in order to assess therapeutic efficacy as early as possible.
