= SLC17A3 =

Protein-coding gene in the species Homo sapiens

Identifiers
- Aliases: SLC17A3, NPT4, GOUT4, UAQTL4, solute carrier family 17 member 3
- External IDs: OMIM: 611034; MGI: 2389216; GeneCards: SLC17A3

Gene location (Human)
Chr.	Chromosome 6 (human)
Band	6p22.2	Start	25,833,066 bp
Band	6p22.2	End	25,882,286 bp

Gene location (Mouse)
Chr.	Chromosome 13 (mouse)
Band	13|13 A3.1	Start	24,023,417 bp
Band	13|13 A3.1	End	24,044,699 bp
RNA expression pattern
Bgee	Human / Mouse (ortholog); Top expressed in: kidney tubule; right lobe of liver; glomerulus; metanephric glomerulus; human kidney; testicle; renal medulla; right adrenal gland; left adrenal gland; right adrenal cortex / Top expressed in: right kidney; human kidney; proximal tubule; left lobe of liver; outer renal medulla; outer stripe of outer renal medulla; glomerulus; distal tubule; proximal straight tubule; proximal convoluted tubule; More reference expression data
BioGPS	n/a
Gene ontology
Molecular function	efflux transmembrane transporter activity; voltage-gated anion channel activity; xenobiotic transmembrane transporter activity; toxin transmembrane transporter activity; symporter activity; organic anion transmembrane transporter activity; sodium:phosphate symporter activity; urate transmembrane transporter activity; sialic acid transmembrane transporter activity
Cellular component	brush border membrane; integral component of membrane; perinuclear region of cytoplasm; membrane; endoplasmic reticulum; integral component of plasma membrane; plasma membrane; cytoplasm; endoplasmic reticulum membrane; apical plasma membrane; lysosome
Biological process	sodium ion transport; sodium ion transmembrane transport; ion transmembrane transport; glucose-6-phosphate transport; organic anion transport; urate metabolic process; phosphate ion transport; urate transport; ion transport; toxin transport; xenobiotic transmembrane transport; transmembrane transport; sialic acid transport; xenobiotic detoxification by transmembrane export across the plasma membrane
Sources:Amigo / QuickGO
Orthologs
Databases	NCBI: entry; OMA: entry
Species	Human	Mouse
Entrez	10786	105355
Ensembl	ENSG00000124564	ENSMUSG00000036083
UniProt	O00476	n/a
RefSeq (mRNA)	NM_006632; NM_001098486	NM_001164743; NM_134069
RefSeq (protein)	NP_001091956; NP_006623	n/a
Location (UCSC)	Chr 6: 25.83 – 25.88 Mb	Chr 13: 24.02 – 24.04 Mb
PubMed search
- Wikidata
View/Edit Human	View/Edit Mouse

Solute carrier family 17 (organic anion transporter), member 3 is a protein that in humans is encoded by the SLC17A3 gene.

== Function ==
The protein encoded by this gene is a voltage-driven transporter that excretes intracellular urate and organic anions from the blood into renal tubule cells. Two transcript variants encoding different isoforms have been found for this gene. The longer isoform is a plasma membrane protein with transporter activity while the shorter isoform localizes to the endoplasmic reticulum.

== See also ==
- Glycogen storage disease type I
