= Cavernous liver hemangioma =

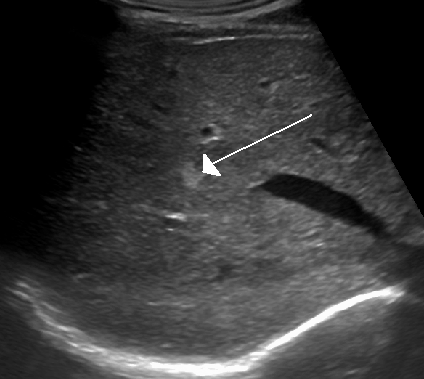
- Hemangioma of the liver as seen on ultrasound
- Specialty: Oncology

A cavernous liver hemangioma or hepatic hemangioma is a benign tumor of the liver composed of large vascular spaces lined by monolayer hepatic endothelial cells. It is the most common benign liver tumour, and is usually asymptomatic and diagnosed incidentally on radiological imaging or during laparotomy for other intra-abdominal issues. Liver hemangiomas are thought to be congenital in origin with an incidence rate of 0.4 – 7.3% as reported in autopsy series.

Several subtypes exist, including the giant hepatic haemangioma (>10cm), which can cause significant complications.

Liver hemangiomas are usually asymptomatic but can present with symptoms such as right upper quadrant pain and abdominal fullness. Treatment options, if necessary, include various surgical methods, such as enucleation or resection.

== Signs and symptoms ==
Hepatic hemangiomas are usually asymptomatic. When they are discovered, it is usually incidental during imaging done for unrelated reasons, such as an abdominal ultrasound or CT scan. Symptoms usually occur when the hemangioma is greater than 4 cm. The most common symptom of a liver hemangioma is right upper quadrant pain in the abdomen. Patients may report a dull, persistent pain or discomfort in this area. Other reported symptoms include fullness, nausea, vomiting, and early satiety. This occurs due to the hemangioma compressing structures next to it, such as the stomach. Rarely, structures such as blood vessels or bile ducts may be obstructed, causing symptoms such as jaundice, thrombosis, or portal hypertension. The larger the hemangioma, the more serious the potential complications. Some hemangiomas may rupture by themselves, causing life-threatening bleeding. Kasabach-Merritt syndrome is a rare condition that occurs when platelets become trapped inside the hemangioma, causing a consumptive coagulopathy that can cause bleeding in other parts of the body. However, serious complications associated with liver hemangiomas are ultimately rare, and the prognosis for most patients is excellent.

== Epidemiology ==
Liver hemangiomas are the most common benign tumor of the liver. Their reported incidence ranges from 0.4%-20%. The wide variation is due to the fact that the majority of these hemangiomas are asymptomatic and are only incidentally identified. Liver hemangiomas most frequently occur in older adults, with some studies reporting a mean age of 49 years. It was previously thought that women were more affected than men; however, recent studies have shown that the incidence is more balanced than before, possibly due to the increased number of hemangiomas found during routine check ups. Liver hemangiomas have also been associated with high levels of estrogen, such as pregnancy and oral contraceptives, due to the presence of estrogen receptors on hemangiomas. However, current guidelines do not indicate avoiding pregnancy or oral contraceptive usage in patients with hemangiomas..

== Diagnosis ==
Ultrasound is usually the first diagnostic imaging test done due to its availability. Liver hemangiomas appear as a well-defined, hyperechoic mass with posterior acoustic enhancement. Color-Doppler US has not shown to improve diagnostic accuracy. US has a sensitivity of 96.9% and a specificity of 60.3% in detecting liver hemangiomas.

On CT, liver hemangiomas appear as a well-demarcated, hypodense mass. Peripheral nodular enhancement with centripetal homogenous filling is typically expected. CT has a sensitivity of 98.3% and a specificity of 55%. The lower specificity of CT means that it may not be sufficient alone to confirm a diagnosis of liver hemangioma.

MRI is considered the gold standard imaging method for hepatic hemangiomas with a sensitivity of 90-100% and a specificity of 91-99%. It appears as a well-defined, smooth, homogenous lesion that is hypotense on T1 and hypertense on T2 weighted images. On T2-weighted MRI, liver hemangiomas are sometimes described as having a "light bulb" appearance due to the bright T2 signal. Compared to CT, MRI offers improved soft tissue contrast, making it the preferred diagnostic imaging method.

Liver biopsy is generally avoided if imaging is inconclusive. Liver hemangiomas tend to be vascular in nature, and so there is an increased risk of bleeding with biopsy.

Hepatic hemangiomas can occur as part of a clinical syndrome, for example Klippel–Trénaunay syndrome, Osler–Weber–Rendu syndrome and Von Hippel–Lindau syndrome.

=== Types ===
- Typical hepatic hemangioma
- Atypical hepatic hemangioma
  - Giant hepatic hemangioma
  - Flash filling hepatic hemangioma – can account for up to 16% of all hepatic hemangiomas
  - Calcified hepatic hemangioma
  - Hyalinized hepatic hemangioma
  - Other unusual imaging patterns
    - Hepatic hemangioma with capsular retraction
    - Hepatic hemangioma with surrounding regional nodular hyperplasia
    - Hepatic hemangioma with fatty infiltration
    - Pedunculated hepatic hemangioma
    - Cystic hepatic hemangioma – rare
    - Fluid-fluid level containing hepatic hemangioma – rare

=== Giant hepatic hemangioma ===
This large, atypical hemangioma of the liver may present with abdominal pain or fullness due to hemorrhage, thrombosis or mass effect. It may also lead to left ventricular volume overload and heart failure due to the increase in cardiac output which it causes. Further complications are Kasabach–Merritt syndrome, a form of consumptive coagulopathy due to thrombocytopaenia, and rupture.

== Imaging follow-up ==
Imaging follow-up for hepatic hemangiomas is guided by lesion size and clinical context. For hemangiomas 5 cm or smaller, no follow-up imaging is required in asymptomatic patients, as these lesions are very unlikely to grow significantly or cause complications. For hemangiomas larger than 5 cm, a contrast-enhanced MRI is recommended at 6 to 12 months after initial diagnosis. If the lesion remains stable, defined as a growth rate of 3 mm per year or less, no further imaging is necessary.

If a hemangioma is found to be growing at a rate greater than 3 mm per year, a repeat contrast-enhanced MRI should be performed within another 6 to 12 months. Should the lesion stabilize at that point, ongoing surveillance is not required. If growth continues to exceed 3 mm per year, referral to a multidisciplinary team for consideration of intervention is recommended.

Some practices perform a liver ultrasound at 6 and 12 months following initial diagnosis, with no further follow-up needed if size is unchanged. Particular situations that may warrant additional imaging include:

- New onset abdominal pain
- Initiation of estrogen therapy
- Pregnancy
- Hemangiomas larger than 10 cm, for which annual ultrasound follow-up may be appropriate

The ACG 2024 guidelines state that pregnant patients and those on oral contraceptive pills do not require additional monitoring solely on the basis of having a hemangioma, as no clear causal link between female sex hormones and hemangioma growth has been established. Routine follow-up imaging is not recommended for small, asymptomatic lesions regardless of hormonal status.

== Management ==
=== Asymptomatic patients ===
Asymptomatic patients do not require treatment, but they may be monitored in case symptoms develop. Surveillance imaging depends on the size of the hemangioma. Lesions 5 cm or smaller require no follow-up imaging. Hemangiomas larger than 5 cm require a contrast-enhanced MRI after 6-12 months. If the lesion has not significantly grown (i.e., less than 3 mm per year), no further imaging is required.

If the hemangioma has grown greater than 3 mm per year, another MRI should be performed within 6-12 months. At this point, if the lesion has not significantly grown, no further imaging is required. However, if the hemangioma continues to grow, the case should be reviewed by a multidisciplinary team to determine whether surgery is appropriate.

=== Surgical ===
Indications for the surgical removal of hemangioma may include the development of pain, especially in patients with rupture, rapidly enlarging lesions, profound thrombocytopenia, or an uncertain diagnosis of a liver mass. Other indications for surgery include a diagnosis of Kasabach Meritt syndrome. Surgery for large masses is performed with enucleation, resection, hepatic artery ligation, and liver transplantation. Enucleation and resection are the most common surgical methods.

Enucleation is the removal of the hemangioma without loss of normal hepatic parenchyma. Anatomical resection involves resection of the hemangioma and corresponding hepatic territory and portal vein. The type of surgery performed depends on the size and location of the hemangioma

The surgical procedure is the choice of the individual surgeon, the most common being enucleation and resection. Massive blood loss can occur during surgery and may result in an operative mortality. Though liver resections can be safely accomplished in specialized units, occasional postoperative complications (bile leak) do occur. Enucleation may represent a safer surgical option with fewer complications for the treatment of hemangiomas, especially in centers with limited experience in liver resections. Most patients fully recover from the procedure and are only hospitalized for less than one week after the procedure.

== See also ==
- Hemangioma
- Liver tumour
