= Hepatocellular adenoma =

Rare benign tumor of the liver

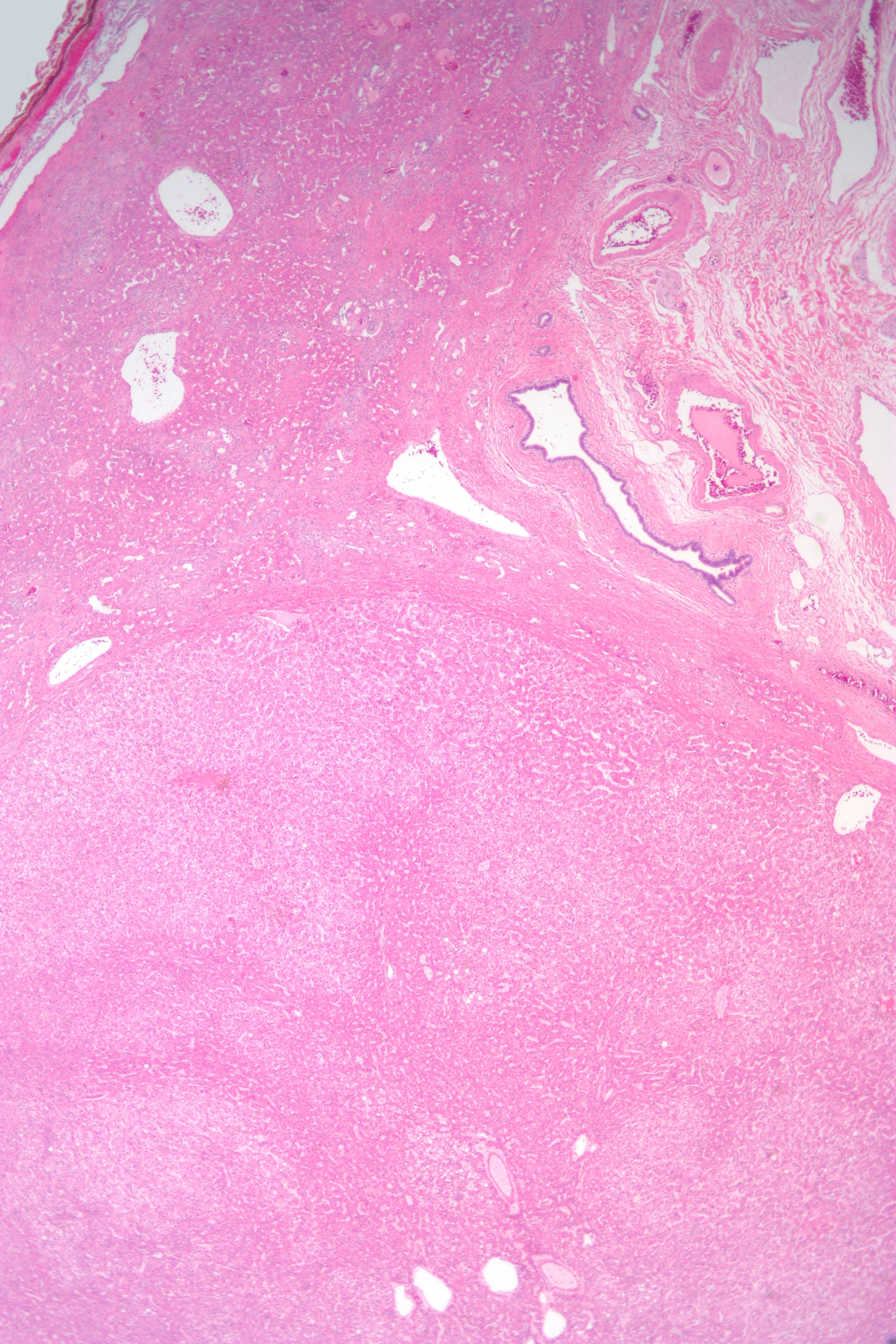
- Micrograph of a hepatic adenoma (bottom of image). H&E stain
- Specialty: Gastroenterology, oncology

Hepatocellular adenoma (also known as hepatic adenoma or hepadenoma) is a rare, benign liver tumor. It most commonly occurs in people with elevated systemic levels of estrogen, classically in women taking estrogen-containing oral contraceptive medication.

== Signs and symptoms ==
About 25–50% of hepatic adenomas cause pain in the right upper quadrant or epigastric region of the abdomen. Since hepatic adenomas can be large (8–15 cm), patients may notice a palpable mass. However, hepatic adenomas are usually asymptomatic, and may be discovered incidentally on imaging ordered for some unrelated reason. Large hepatic adenomas have a tendency to rupture and bleed massively inside the abdomen. If not treated, there is a 30% risk of bleeding. Bleeding may lead to hypotension, tachycardia, and sweating (diaphoresis).

Hepatic adenomas are associated with glycogen storage diseases, type 1 diabetes, as well as anabolic steroid use.

== Diagnosis ==
Hepatic adenoma is usually detected by imaging, typically an ultrasound or CT, as a hyperenhancing liver nodule. Given that several liver tumors appear similarly on these imaging modalities, a multi-phase contrast-enhanced imaging study such as CT or MRI may be used to provide more information. The significance of making a specific diagnosis is that, unlike other benign liver tumors such as hemangioma and focal nodular hyperplasia, hepatic adenomas have a small but meaningful risk of progressing into a malignancy. Although imaging provides supportive information, a definitive diagnosis of hepatic adenoma requires biopsy of the tissue.

=== Radiologic differential diagnosis ===
- Echinococcal cyst
- Focal fatty change
- Focal nodular hyperplasia
- Hepatoblastoma
- Infiltrative liver disease
- Inflammatory pseudotumor
- Leiomyosarcoma
- Lymphoma
- Nodular regenerative hyperplasia

=== Subtypes ===
Hepatic adenomas may be sub-classified according to morphologic appearance by microscopy, immunohistochemical staining, and genetic mutational analysis:

- Inflammatory (40–50%)
- HNF1α-inactivated (35–40%)
- β-catenin–activated – with exon 3 versus exon 7/8 mutation
- β-Catenin–activated inflammatory – with exon 3 versus exon 7/8 mutation
- Unclassified

Although the significance of this categorization is still under research, the subtypes may indicate differential risk of hemorrhage or malignant transformation.

=== Pathologic diagnosis ===
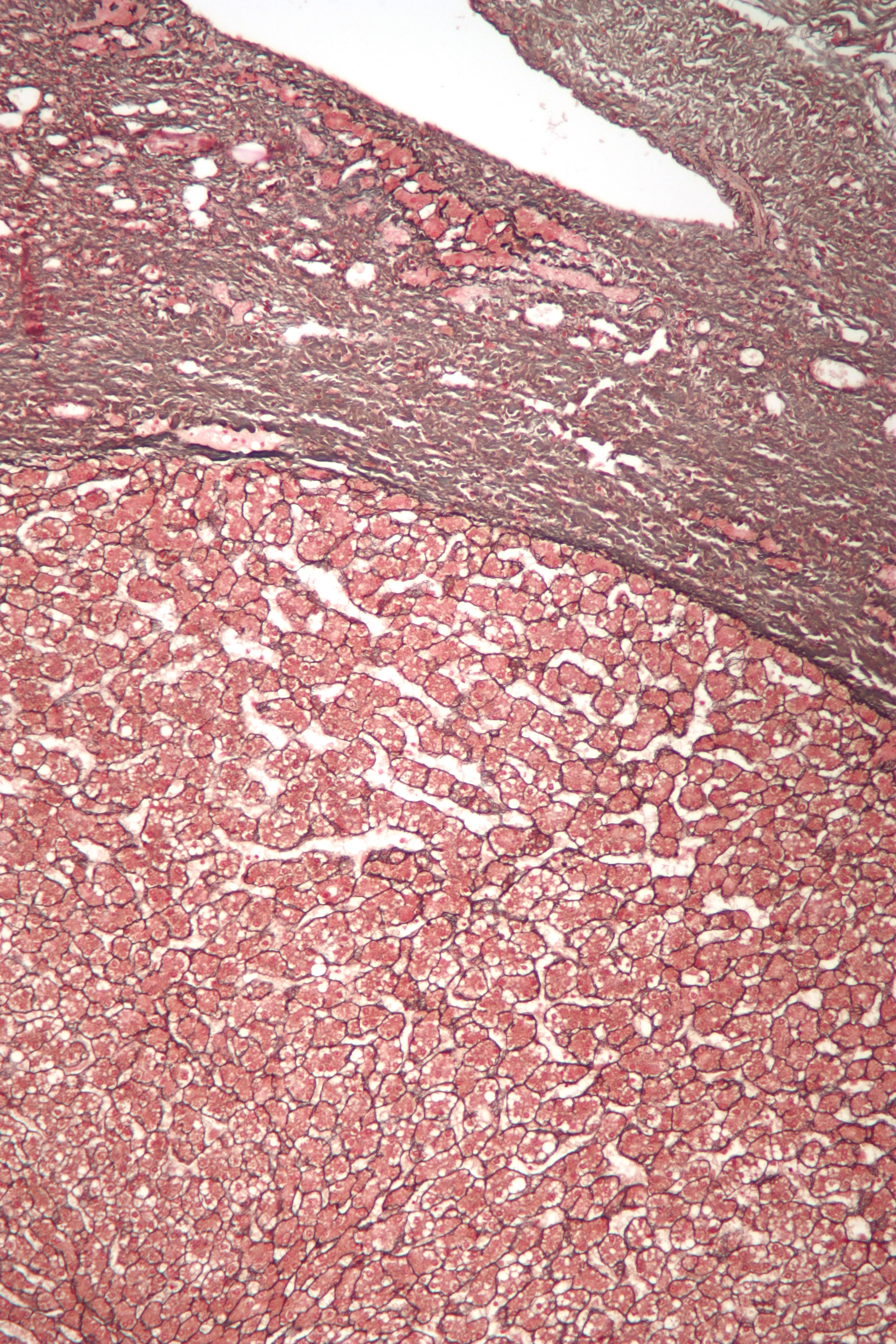
Micrograph of a hepatic adenoma demonstrating a regular reticulin scaffold. Reticulin stain

Hepatic adenomas are, typically, well-circumscribed nodules that consist of sheets of hepatocytes with a bubbly vacuolated cytoplasm. The hepatocytes are on a regular reticulin scaffold and less or equal to three cell thick.

The histologic diagnosis of hepatic adenomas can be aided by reticulin staining. In hepatic adenomas, the reticulin scaffold is preserved and hepatocytes do not form layers of four or more hepatocytes, as is seen in hepatocellular carcinoma.

Cells resemble normal hepatocytes and are traversed by blood vessels but lack portal tracts or central veins.

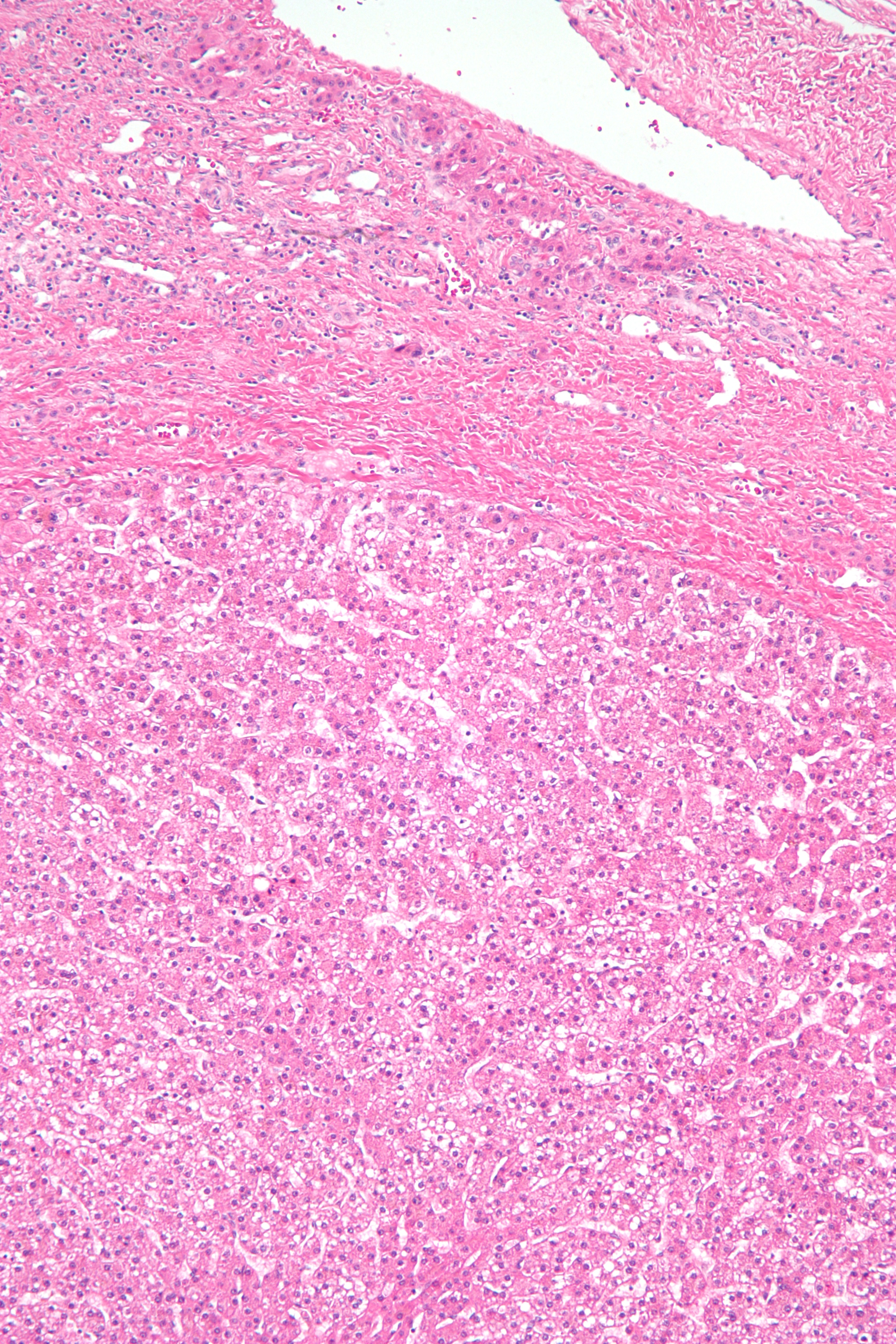
Micrograph of hepatic adenoma. H&E stain

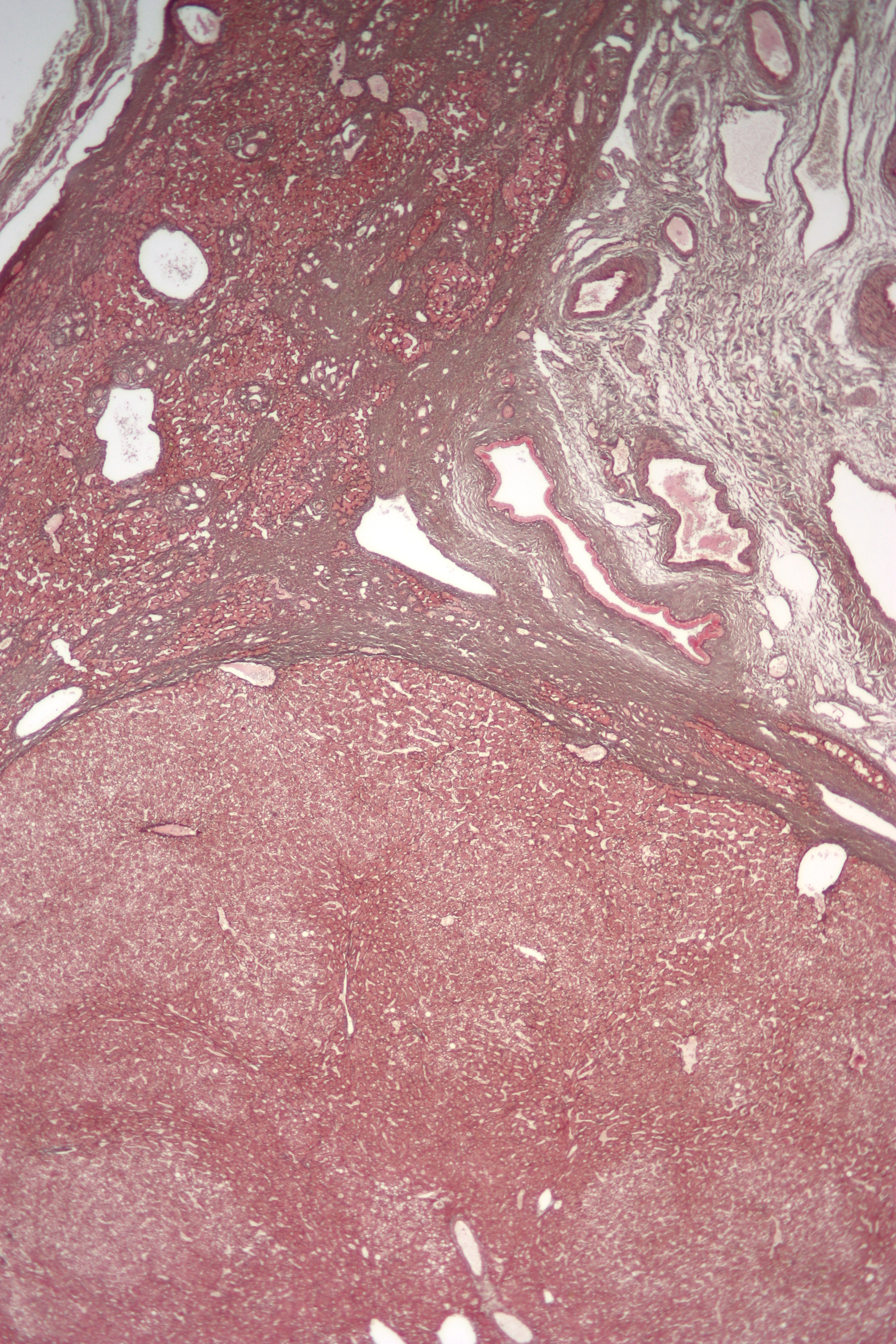
Micrograph of hepatic adenoma. Reticulin stain

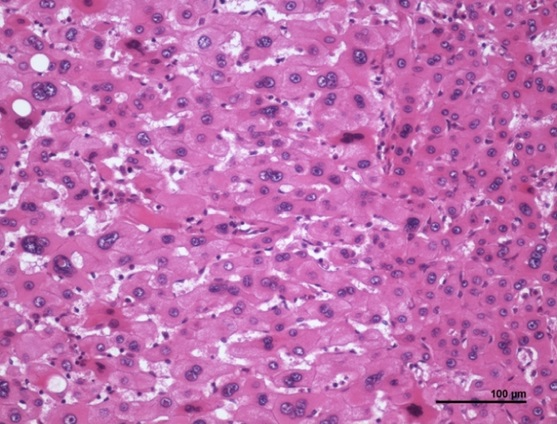
Inflammatory hepatocellular adenoma

== Treatment ==
Some authors feel that all hepatocellular adenoma should be resected, because of the risk of rupture causing bleeding and because they may contain malignant cells. Current recommendations are that all hepatic adenomas should be resected, as long as they are surgically accessible and the patient is a reasonable operative candidate. Patients with adenomas should avoid oral contraceptives or hormonal replacement therapy.

Pregnancy could cause the adenoma to grow faster, so patients with hepatic adenomas should avoid pregnancy.

== Epidemiology ==
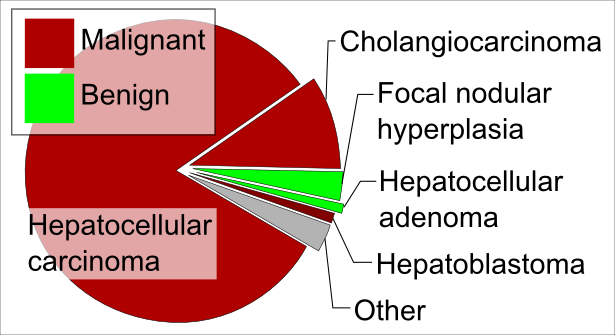
Liver tumor types by relative incidence in adults in the United States, with hepatocellular adenoma at right

The majority of hepatic adenomas arise in women aged 20–40, most of whom use oral contraceptives. Other medications which also alter circulating hormone levels, such as anabolic or androgenic steroids, Barbiturates, clomifene, have also been implicated as risk factors.

Incidence of adenomas may be increased in metabolic diseases, including tyrosinemia and type 1 diabetes mellitus, and glycogen storage diseases (types 1 and 3), as well as in beta-thalassemia and hemochromatosis.
