= Focal nodular hyperplasia =

Benign tumor of the liver

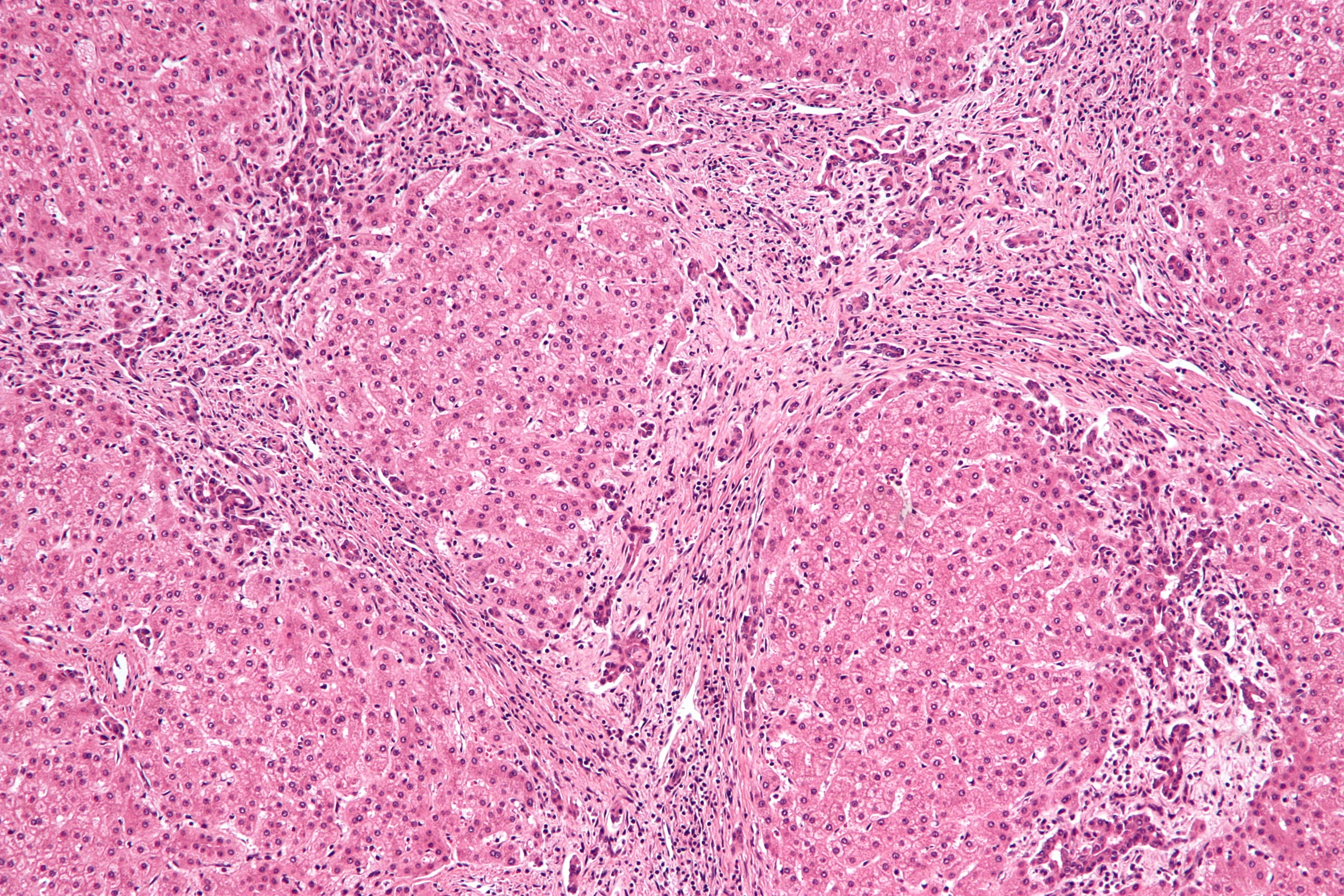
- Micrograph of focal nodular hyperplasia. H&E stain.
- Specialty: Gastroenterology

Focal nodular hyperplasia is a benign tumor of the liver (hepatic tumor), which is the second most prevalent tumor of the liver after hepatic hemangioma. It is usually asymptomatic, rarely grows or bleeds, and has no malignant potential. This tumor was once often resected because it was difficult to distinguish from hepatic adenoma, but with modern multiphase imaging it is usually now diagnosed by strict imaging criteria and not resected.

== Presentation ==
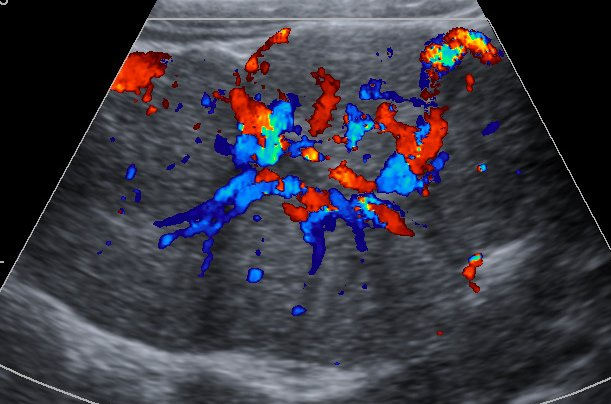
Ultrasound of malformed vessels within the fibrous scar of focal nodular hyperplasia

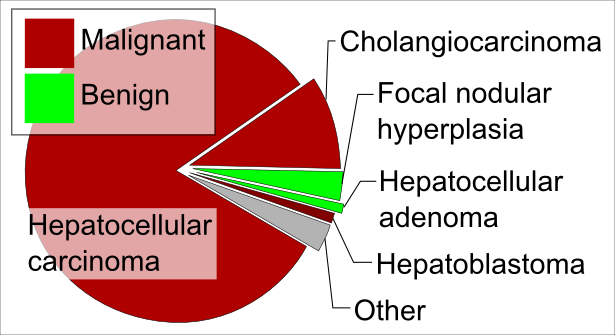
Liver tumor types by relative incidence in adults in the United States, with focal nodular hyperplasia at right

Focal nodular hyperplasia's most recognizable gross feature is a central stellate scar seen in 60–70% of cases. Microscopically, a lobular proliferation of bland-appearing hepatocytes with a bile ductular proliferation and malformed vessels within the fibrous scar is the most common pattern. Other patterns include telangiectatic, hyperplastic-adenomatous, and lesions with focal large-cell dysplasia. Rarely, these lesions may be multiple or can occur as part of a syndrome with hemangiomas, epithelioid hemangioendothelioma, hepatic adenomas, fibrolamellar hepatocellular carcinoma, vascular malformations of the brain, meningiomas, and/or astrocytomas.

== Pathophysiology ==
Focal nodular hyperplasia is not a neoplasm; it is believed to result from localized hyperplastic hepatocyte response to an underlying congenital arteriovenous malformation. It consists of normal liver constituents in an abnormally organized pattern, grows in a stellate pattern and may display central necrosis when large. Additionally evidence suggests that the incidence of focal nodular hyperplasia is related to oral contraceptive use.

== Diagnosis ==
Unenhanced CT or MRI usually does not show the difference in intensity between the focal nodular hyperplasia and surrounding liver except when there is marked liver steatosis that reduces the attenuation of the liver, causing focal nodular hyperplasia to be hyperattenuating when compared with the surrounding liver. In the arterial phase CT or MRI, there is a strong enhancement not followed by washout. The lesion presents a slight hyperintensity or isodensity on portal venous phase or delayed phase images. There is also a presence of a central scar and absence of a capsule for the focal nodular hyperplasia.

== Treatment ==
Frequent monitoring through periodic imaging at intervals of three to six months is advised. Nevertheless, in cases where a patient exhibits symptoms, when there are suspicions of an underlying malignancy following an inconclusive biopsy, or when a lesion demonstrates sustained growth, medical professionals commonly opt for a biopsy or surgical removal. Surgical resection remains the established and definitive course of treatment.

== Epidemiology ==
The prevalence of focal nodular hyperplasia in individuals undergoing evaluation with an ultrasound of the abdomen is 0.03%. About 20% of focal nodular hyperplasia lesions are associated with hepatic hemangiomas.
