= Genetic recombination =

Shuffling of genetic material

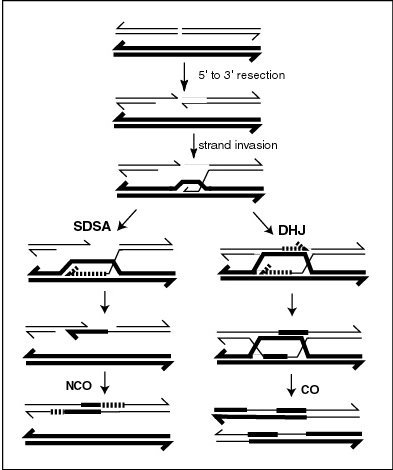
A model of meiotic recombination, initiated by a double-strand break or gap, followed by pairing with an homologous chromosome and strand invasion to initiate the recombinational repair process. Repair of the gap can lead to crossover (CO) or non-crossover (NCO) of the flanking regions. CO recombination is thought to occur by the Double Holliday Junction (DHJ) model, illustrated on the right. NCO recombinants are thought to occur primarily by the Synthesis Dependent Strand Annealing (SDSA) model, illustrated on the left. Most recombination events appear to be the SDSA type.

Genetic recombination (also known as genetic reshuffling) is the exchange of genetic material between different organisms which leads to production of offspring with combinations of traits that differ from those found in either parent. In eukaryotes, genetic recombination during meiosis can lead to a novel set of genetic information that can be further passed on from parents to offspring. Most recombination occurs naturally and can be classified into two types: (1) interchromosomal recombination, occurring through independent assortment of alleles whose loci are on different but homologous chromosomes (random orientation of pairs of homologous chromosomes in meiosis I); & (2) intrachromosomal recombination, occurring through crossing over.

During meiosis in eukaryotes, genetic recombination involves the pairing of homologous chromosomes. This may be followed by information transfer between the chromosomes. The information transfer may occur without physical exchange (a section of genetic material is copied from one chromosome to another, without the donating chromosome being changed) (see SDSA – Synthesis Dependent Strand Annealing pathway in Figure); or by the breaking and rejoining of DNA strands, which forms new molecules of DNA (see DHJ pathway in Figure).

Recombination may also occur during mitosis in eukaryotes where it ordinarily involves the two sister chromatids formed after chromosomal replication. In this case, new combinations of alleles are not produced since the sister chromatids are usually identical. In meiosis and mitosis, recombination occurs between similar molecules of DNA (homologous sequences). In meiosis, non-sister homologous chromosomes pair with each other so that recombination characteristically occurs between non-sister homologues. In both meiotic and mitotic cells, recombination between homologous chromosomes is a common mechanism used in DNA repair.

Gene conversion – the process during which homologous sequences are made identical also falls under genetic recombination.

Genetic recombination and recombinational DNA repair also occurs in bacteria and archaea, which use asexual reproduction.

Recombination can be artificially induced in laboratory (in vitro) settings, producing recombinant DNA for purposes including vaccine development.

V(D)J recombination in organisms with an adaptive immune system is a type of site-specific genetic recombination that helps immune cells rapidly diversify to recognize and adapt to new pathogens.

== Mechanism ==
Genetic recombination is catalyzed by many different enzymes. Recombinases are key enzymes that catalyse the strand transfer step during recombination. RecA, the chief recombinase found in Escherichia coli, is responsible for the repair of DNA double strand breaks (DSBs). In yeast and other eukaryotic organisms there are two recombinases required for repairing DSBs. The RAD51 protein is required for mitotic and meiotic recombination, whereas the DNA repair protein, DMC1, is specific to meiotic recombination. In the archaea, the ortholog of the bacterial RecA protein is RadA.

=== Bacterial recombination ===
Bacteria regularly undergo genetic recombination in three main ways:

- Transformation, the uptake of exogenous DNA from the surrounding environment.
- Transduction, the virus-mediated transfer of DNA between bacteria.
- Conjugation, the transfer of DNA from one bacterium to another via cell-to-cell contact.

Sometimes a strand of DNA is transferred into the target cell but fails to be copied as the target divides. This is called an abortive transfer.

== Meiotic recombination ==
A molecular model for the mechanism of meiotic recombination presented by Anderson and Sekelsky is outlined in the first figure in this article. Two of the four chromatids present early in meiosis (prophase I) are paired with each other and able to interact. Recombination, in this model, is initiated by a double-strand break (or gap) shown in the DNA molecule (chromatid) at the top of the figure. Other types of DNA damage may also initiate recombination. For instance, an inter-strand cross-link (caused by exposure to a cross-linking agent such as mitomycin C) can be repaired by HRR.

Two types of recombinant product are produced. Indicated on the right side is a "crossover" (CO) type, where the flanking regions of the chromosomes are exchanged, and on the left side, a "non-crossover" (NCO) type where the flanking regions are not exchanged. The CO type of recombination involves the intermediate formation of two "Holliday junctions" indicated in the lower right of the figure by two X-shaped structures in each of which there is an exchange of single strands between the two participating chromatids. This pathway is labeled in the figure as the DHJ (double-Holliday junction) pathway.

The NCO recombinants (illustrated on the left in the figure) are produced by a process referred to as "synthesis dependent strand annealing" (SDSA). Recombination events of the NCO/SDSA type appear to be more common than the CO/DHJ type. The NCO/SDSA pathway contributes little to genetic variation, since the arms of the chromosomes flanking the recombination event remain in the parental configuration. Thus, explanations for the adaptive function of meiosis that focus exclusively on crossing-over are inadequate to explain the majority of recombination events.

=== Synapsis ===
During meiosis, synapsis (the pairing of homologous chromosomes) ordinarily precedes genetic recombination.

=== Chromosomal crossover ===
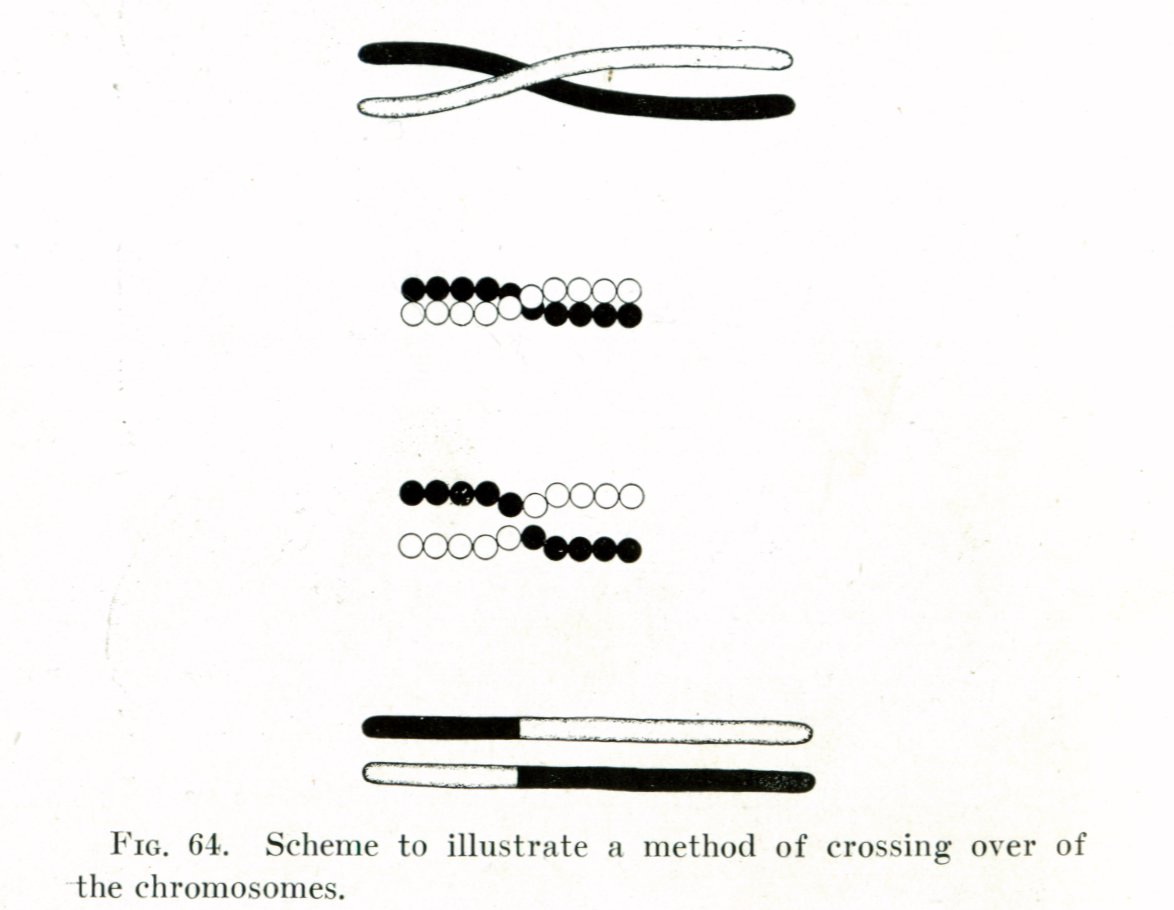
Thomas Hunt Morgan's illustration of crossing over (1916)

In eukaryotes, recombination during meiosis is facilitated by chromosomal crossover. The crossover process leads to offspring having different combinations of genes from those of their parents, and can occasionally produce new chimeric alleles. The shuffling of genes brought about by genetic recombination produces increased genetic variation. It also allows sexually reproducing organisms to avoid Muller's ratchet, in which the genomes of an asexual population tend to accumulate more deleterious mutations over time than beneficial or reversing mutations.

Chromosomal crossover involves recombination between the paired chromosomes inherited from each of one's parents, generally occurring during meiosis. During prophase I (pachytene stage) the four available chromatids are in tight formation with one another. While in this formation, homologous sites on two chromatids can closely pair with one another, and may exchange genetic information.

Because there is a small probability of recombination at any location along a chromosome, the frequency of recombination between two locations depends on the distance separating them. Therefore, for genes sufficiently distant on the same chromosome, the amount of crossover is high enough to destroy the correlation between alleles.

Tracking the movement of genes resulting from crossovers has proven quite useful to geneticists. Because two genes that are close together are less likely to become separated than genes that are farther apart, geneticists can deduce roughly how far apart two genes are on a chromosome if they know the frequency of the crossovers. Geneticists can also use this method to infer the presence of certain genes. Genes that typically stay together during recombination are said to be linked. One gene in a linked pair can sometimes be used as a marker to deduce the presence of the other gene. This is typically used to detect the presence of a disease-causing gene.

The recombination frequency between two loci observed is the crossing-over value. It is the frequency of crossing over between two linked gene loci (markers), and depends on the distance between the genetic loci observed. For any fixed set of genetic and environmental conditions, recombination in a particular region of a linkage structure (chromosome) tends to be constant, and the same is then true for the crossing-over value which is used in the production of genetic maps.

=== Achiasmy and heterochiasmy ===
Achiasmy is the phenomenon where autosomal recombination is completely absent in one sex of a species. Achiasmatic chromosomal segregation is well documented in male Drosophila melanogaster. The "Haldane-Huxley rule" states that achiasmy usually occurs in the heterogametic sex.

Heterochiasmy occurs when recombination rates differ between the sexes of a species. In humans, each oocyte has on average 41.6 ± 11.3 recombinations, 1.63-fold higher than sperms. This sexual dimorphic pattern in recombination rate has been observed in many species. In mammals, females most often have higher rates of recombination.

== Gene conversion ==
In gene conversion, a section of genetic material is copied from one chromosome to another, without the donating chromosome being changed. Gene conversion occurs at high frequency at the actual site of the recombination event during meiosis. It is a process by which a DNA sequence is copied from one DNA helix (which remains unchanged) to another DNA helix, whose sequence is altered. Gene conversion has often been studied in fungal crosses where the 4 products of individual meioses can be conveniently observed. Gene conversion events can be distinguished as deviations in an individual meiosis from the normal 2:2 segregation pattern (e.g. a 3:1 pattern).

== Nonhomologous recombination ==
Recombination can occur between DNA sequences that contain no sequence homology. This can cause chromosomal translocations, sometimes leading to cancer.

== In B cells ==
B cells of the immune system perform genetic recombination, called immunoglobulin class switching. It is a biological mechanism that changes an antibody from one class to another, for example, from an isotype called IgM to an isotype called IgG.

== Recombinational repair ==
DNA damages caused by a variety of exogenous agents (e.g., UV light, X-rays, chemical cross-linking agents) can be repaired by homologous recombinational repair (HRR). These findings suggest that DNA damages arising from natural processes, such as exposure to reactive oxygen species that are byproducts of normal metabolism, are also repaired by HRR. In humans, deficiencies in the gene products necessary for HRR during meiosis likely cause infertility In humans, deficiencies in gene products necessary for HRR, such as BRCA1 and BRCA2, increase the risk of cancer (see DNA repair-deficiency disorder).

In bacteria, transformation is a process of gene transfer that ordinarily occurs between individual cells of the same bacterial species. Transformation involves integration of donor DNA into the recipient chromosome by recombination. This process appears to be an adaptation for repairing DNA damages in the recipient chromosome by HRR. Transformation may provide a benefit to pathogenic bacteria by allowing repair of DNA damage, particularly damages that occur in the inflammatory, oxidizing environment associated with infection of a host.

When two or more viruses, each containing lethal genomic damages, infect the same host cell, the virus genomes can often pair with each other and undergo HRR to produce viable progeny. This process, referred to as multiplicity reactivation, has been studied in lambda and T4 bacteriophages, as well as in several pathogenic viruses. In the case of pathogenic viruses, multiplicity reactivation may be an adaptive benefit to the virus since it allows the repair of DNA damages caused by exposure to the oxidizing environment produced during host infection. See also reassortment.

== In viruses ==
Numerous RNA viruses are capable of genetic recombination when at least two viral genomes are present in the same host cell. Recombination is largely responsible for RNA virus diversity and immune evasion. Some DNA viruses such as the bacteriophage T4 (dsDNA) are also capable of recombination.

Recombination in RNA viruses appears to be an adaptation for coping with genome damage, as shown in the well-known process of multiplicity reactivation (MR). Infection of animal cells tends to produce inflammation and lead to reactive oxygen species production, which could damage the viral genome. Switching between template strands during genome replication, referred to as copy-choice recombination, was originally proposed to explain the positive correlation of recombination events over short distances in organisms with a DNA genome (see above, SDSA pathway).

Recombination can occur infrequently between viruses of divergent species infecting the same cell. The resulting recombinant viruses combines a combination of the genomic material from either virus. When this kind of recombination happens in an animal, the result is sometimes a virus that can efficiently infect humans, leading to an outbreak.

=== DNA ===
In phage T4 (dsDNA), recombination happens by homologous recombination repair. Other dsDNA viruses known to undergo MR seem to use a similar mechanism; these include the Adenoviridae (e.g. Adenovirus), Herpesviridae (e.g. herpes simnplex virus), Polyomaviridae (e.g. simian virus 40), Poxviridae (e.g. vaccinia virus).

=== dsRNA ===
The dsRNA Reovirales, which includes the reoviruses that causes diarrhea in children, are known to undergo MR.

=== (+)ssRNA ===
In the Picornaviridae, which includes the enteroviruses (including the poliovirus), RNA recombination appears to be a major driving force in determining genome architecture and the course of viral evolution. When replicating its (+)ssRNA genome, the poliovirus RNA-dependent RNA polymerase (RdRp) is able to carry out recombination. Recombination appears to occur by a copy choice mechanism in which the RdRp switches (+)ssRNA templates during negative strand synthesis.

The Tombusviridae includes plant viruses such as carmoviruses and tombusviruses. Recombination also occurs by RdRp strand switching.

==== Coronaviridae ====
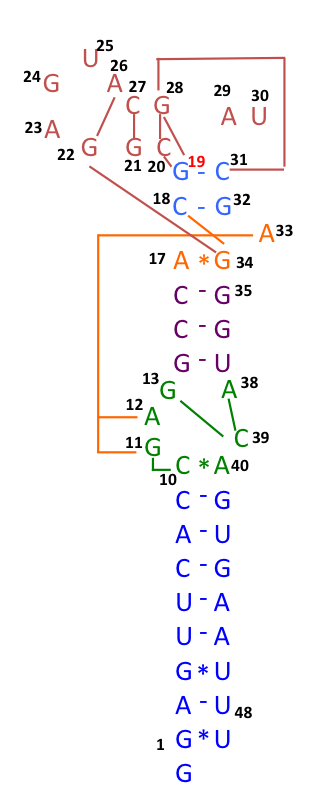
Schematic representation of the s2m RNA secondary structure, with tertiary structural interactions indicated as long range contacts.

Recombination appears to be a major driving force in determining genetic variability within coronaviruses, as well as the ability of coronavirus species to jump from one host to another and, infrequently, for the emergence of novel species, although the mechanism of recombination in is unclear. Especially in coronaviruses, recombination may also occur even among distantly related evolutionary groups (subgenera), due to their characteristic transcription mechanism, that involves subgenomic mRNAs that are formed by template switching.

The coronavirus spike gene, which encodes the spike protein for gaining entry into cells, contains hotspots for both homologous and non-homologous recombination between different lineages. This allows the viruses to effectively swap their spike genes which determine their target species and cell types.

===== SARS‐CoV‐2 =====
In early 2020, many genomic sequences of Australian SARS‐CoV‐2 isolates have deletions or mutations (29742G>A or 29742G>U; "G19A" or "G19U") in the s2m, suggesting that RNA recombination may have occurred in this RNA element. 29742G("G19"), 29744G("G21"), and 29751G("G28") were predicted as recombination hotspots. During the first months of the COVID-19 pandemic, such a recombination event was suggested to have been a critical step in the evolution of SARS-CoV-2's ability to infect humans. Linkage disequilibrium analysis confirmed that RNA recombination with the 11083G > T mutation also contributed to the increase of mutations among the viral progeny. The findings indicate that the 11083G > T mutation of SARS-CoV-2 spread during Diamond Princess shipboard quarantine and arose through de novo RNA recombination under positive selection pressure. In three patients on the Diamond Princess cruise, two mutations, 29736G > T and 29751G > T (G13 and G28) were located in Coronavirus 3′ stem-loop II-like motif (s2m) of SARS-CoV-2. Although s2m is considered an RNA motif highly conserved in 3' untranslated region among many coronavirus species, this result also suggests that s2m of SARS-CoV-2 is RNA recombination/mutation hotspot.

SARS-CoV-2's entire receptor binding motif appeared, based on preliminary observations, to have been introduced through recombination from coronaviruses of pangolins. However, more comprehensive analyses later refuted this suggestion and showed that SARS-CoV-2 likely evolved solely within bats and with little or no recombination.

=== (-)ssRNA ===
The Orthomyxoviridae (which includes the influenza virus) are known to undergo MR, though in this case MR can be due to a combination of both reassortment and intra-segmental recombination.

=== ssRNA-RT ===
MR occurs in the Retroviridae, specifically in HIV. Damage in the RNA genome appears to be avoided during reverse transcription by strand switching (copy-choice recombination) between two damaged ssRNA genome copies. HIV carries two copies of its genome in each virion, which likely helps make such a repair possible.

Recombination between divergent lineages of HIV also helps the development of genetic diversity. For this to happen, two different HIVs must infect the same cell, leading to a chimeric virion carrying two different genomes. When this chimeric virion infects another cell, recombination can happen in that cell. This kind of recombination likely contributes to drug resistance and possibly helps with immune evasion.

== Role of recombination in the origin of life ==
Nowak and Ohtsuki noted that the origin of life (abiogenesis) is also the origin of biological evolution. They pointed out that all known life on earth is based on biopolymers and proposed that any theory for the origin of life must involve biological polymers that act as information carriers and catalysts. Lehman argued that recombination was an evolutionary development as ancient as the origins of life. Smail et al. proposed that in the primordial Earth, recombination played a key role in the expansion of the initially short informational polymers (presumed to be RNA) that were the precursors to life.

== Genetic engineering ==
In genetic engineering, recombination can also refer to artificial and deliberate recombination of disparate pieces of DNA, often from different organisms, creating what is called recombinant DNA. A prime example of such a use of genetic recombination is gene targeting, which can be used to add, delete or otherwise change an organism's genes. This technique is important to biomedical researchers as it allows them to study the effects of specific genes. Techniques based on genetic recombination are also applied in protein engineering to develop new proteins of biological interest.

Examples include Restriction enzyme mediated integration, Gibson assembly and Golden Gate Cloning.

== See also ==
- Eukaryote hybrid genome
- Four-gamete test
- Homologous recombination
- Independent assortment
- Recombination frequency
- Recombination hotspot
- Site-specific recombinase technology
- Site-specific recombination
- Reassortment
- V(D)J recombination
