= Viral transformation =

Viral transformation is the change in growth, phenotype, or indefinite reproduction of cells caused by the introduction of inheritable material. Through this process, a virus causes harmful transformations of an in vivo cell or cell culture. The term can also be understood as DNA transfection using a viral vector.

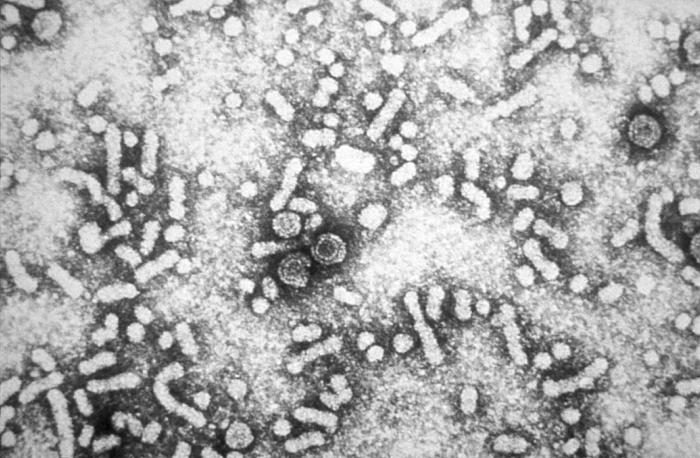
Figure 1: Hepatitis-B virions

Viral transformation can occur both naturally and medically. Natural transformations can include viral cancers, such as human papillomavirus (HPV) and T-cell Leukemia virus type I. Hepatitis B and C are also the result of natural viral transformation of the host cells. Viral transformation can also be induced for use in medical treatments.

Cells that have been virally transformed can be differentiated from untransformed cells through a variety of growth, surface, and intracellular observations. The growth of transformed cells can be impacted by a loss of growth limitation caused by cell contact, less oriented growth, and high saturation density. Transformed cells can lose their tight junctions, increase their rate of nutrient transfer, and increase their protease secretion. Transformation can also affect the cytoskeleton and change in the quantity of signal molecules.

== Type ==
There are three types of viral infections that can be considered under the topic of viral transformation. These are cytocidal, persistent, and transforming infections. Cytocidal infections can cause fusion of adjacent cells, disruption of transport pathways including ions and other cell signals, disruption of DNA, RNA and protein synthesis, and nearly always leads to cell death. Persistent infections involve viral material that lays dormant within a cell until activated by some stimulus. This type of infection usually causes few obvious changes within the cell but can lead to long chronic diseases. Transforming infections are also referred to as malignant transformation. This infection causes a host cell to become malignant and can be either cytocidal (usually in the case of RNA viruses) or persistent (usually in the case of DNA viruses). Cells with transforming infections undergo immortalization and inherit the genetic material to produce tumors. Since the term cytocidal, or cytolytic, refers to cell death, these three infections are not mutually exclusive. Many transforming infections by DNA tumor viruses are also cytocidal.

Table 1: Cellular effects of viral infections

		Genetic	Cell Fate	Morphological	Biochemical	Physiological
Cytocidal	Productive ----------------- Abortive	DNA degradation ----------------- Possible mutation	Death ----------------- Usually death	Rounding of the cell Fusion with adjacent cells Appearance of inclusion bodies	Inhibit DNA, RNA, and protein synthesis Interfere with sub-cellular interactions	Insufficient movement of ions Formation of secondary messengers Activation of cellular cascades
Persistent	Latent ----------------- Chronic ----------------- Slow	Possible Mutation ----------------- Possible Mutation ----------------- Possible Mutation	Survival ----------------- Variable ----------------- Variable	Fusion with adjacent cells Appearance of inclusion bodies Budding	Immune responses limit viral spread Antigen-antibody complexes can incorporate viral antigens causing inflammation	Rare until stimulated
Transforming	DNA viruses ----------------- RNA viruses	Mutation ----------------- Mutation	Survival ----------------- Survival	Unlimited cell replication	Inactivates tumor suppressor proteins Impairs cell cycle regulation	Unlimited cell replication

=== Cytocidal infections ===
Cytocidal infections are often associated with changes in cell morphology, physiology and are thus important for the complete viral replication and transformation. Cytopathic Effects, often include a change in cell's morphology such as fusion with adjacent cells to form polykaryocytes as well as the synthesis of nuclear and cytoplasmic inclusion bodies. Physiological changes include the insufficient movement of ions, formation of secondary messengers, and activation of cellular cascades to continue cellular activity. Biochemically, many viruses inhibit the synthesis of host DNA, RNA, proteins directly or even interfere with protein-protein, DNA-protein, RNA-protein interactions at the subcellular level. Genotoxicity involves breaking, fragmenting, or rearranging chromosomes of the host. Lastly, biologic effects include the viruses' ability to affect the activity of antigens and immunologlobulins in the host cell.

There are two types of cytocidal infections, productive and abortive. In productive infections, additional infectious viruses are produced. Abortive infections do not produce infectious viruses. One example of a productive cytocidal infection is the herpes virus.

=== Persistent infections ===
There are three types of persistent infections, latent, chronic and slow, in which the virus stays inside the host cell for prolonged periods of time. During latent infections there is minimal to no expression of infected viral genome. The genome remains within the host cell until the virus is ready for replication. Chronic infections have similar cellular effects as acute cytocidal infections but there is a limited number of progeny and viruses involved in transformation. Lastly, slow infections have a longer incubation period in which no physiological, morphological or subcellular changes may be involved.

=== Transforming infections ===
Transformation infections is limited to abortive or restrictive infections. This constitutes the broadest category of infections as it can include both cytocidal and persistent infection. Viral transformation is most commonly understood as transforming infections, so the remainder of the article focuses on detailing transforming infections.

== Process ==
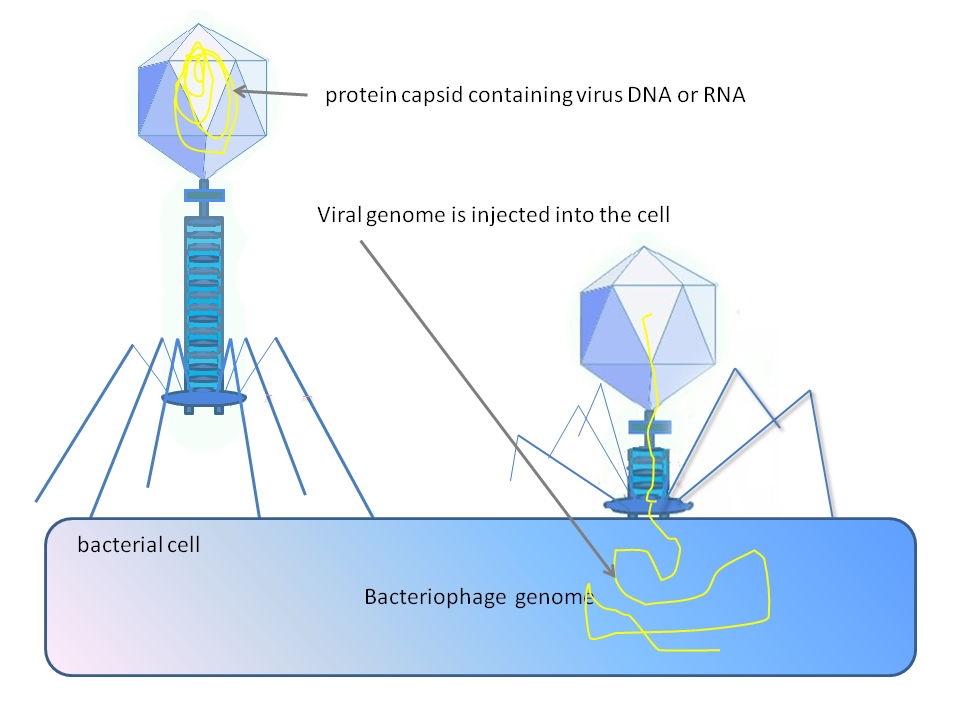
Figure 2: Phage injecting its genome into bacterial cell

In order for a cell to be transformed by a virus, the viral DNA must be entered into the host cell. The simplest consideration is viral transformation of a bacterial cell. This process is called lysogeny. As shown in Figure 2, a bacteriophage lands on a cell and pins itself to the cell. The phage can then penetrate the cell membrane and inject the viral DNA into the host cell. The viral DNA can then either lay dormant until stimulated by a source such as UV light or it can be immediately taken up by the host's genome. In either case the viral DNA will replicate along with the original host DNA during cell replication causing two cells to now be infected with the virus. The process will continue to propagate more and more infected cells. This process is in contrast to the lytic cycle where a virus only uses the host cell's replication machinery to replicate itself before destroying the host cell.

Figure 3: Examples of endocytosis

The process is similar in animal cells. In most cases, rather than viral DNA being injected into an animal cell, a section of the membrane encases the virus and the cell then absorbs both the virus and the encasing section of the membrane into the cell. This process, called endocytosis, is shown in Figure 3.

== Transformation of the host cell ==
Viral transformation disrupts the normal expression of the host cell's genes in favor of expressing a limited number of viral genes. The virus also can disrupt communication between cells and cause cells to divide at an increased rate.

=== Physiological ===
Viral transformation can impose characteristically determinable features upon a cell. Typical phenotypic changes include high saturation density, anchorage-independent growth, loss of contact inhibition, loss of orientated growth, immortalization, disruption of the cell's cytoskeleton.

=== Biochemical ===
Viral genes are expressed through the use of the host cell's replication machinery; therefore, many viral genes have promoters that support binding of many transcription factors found naturally in the host cells. These transcription factors along with the virus' own proteins can repress or activate genes from both the virus and the host cell's genome. Many viruses can also increase the production of the cell's regulatory proteins.

=== Genetic ===
Depending on the virus, a variety of genetic changes can occur in the host cell. In the case of a lytic cycle virus, the cell will only survive long enough to the replication machinery to be used to create additional viral units. In other cases, the viral DNA will persist within the host cell and replicate as the cell replicates. This viral DNA can either be incorporated into the host cell's genetic material or persist as a separate genetic vector. Either case can lead to damage of the host cell's chromosomes. It is possible that the damage can be repaired; however, the most common result is an instability in the original genetic material or suppression or alteration of the gene expression.

== Assays ==
An assay is an analytic tool often used in a laboratory setting in order to assess or measure some quality of a target entity. In virology, assays can be used to differentiate between transformed and non-transformed cells. Varying the assay used, changes the selective pressure on the cells and therefore can change what properties are selected in the transformed cells.

Three common assays used are the focus forming assay, the Anchorage independent growth assay, and the reduced serum assay.

The focus forming assay (FFA) is used to grow cells containing a transforming oncogene on a monolayer of non-transformed cells. The transformed cells will form raised, dense spots on the sample as they grow without contact inhibition. This assay is highly sensitive compared to other assays used for viral analysis, such as the yield reduction assay.

An example of the Anchorage independent growth assay is the soft agar assay. The assay is assessing the cells' ability to grow in a gel or viscous fluid. Transformed cells can grow in this environment and are considered anchorage independent. Cells that can only grow when attached to a solid surface are anchorage dependent untransformed cells. This assay is considered one of the most stringent for detection of malignant transformation

In a reduced serum assay, cells are assayed by exploiting the changes in cell serum requirements. Non-transformed cells require at least a 5% serum medium in order to grow; however, transformed cells can grow in an environment with significantly less serum.

== Examples of Natural Transformation ==
Natural transformation is the viral transformation of cells without the interference of medical science. This is the most commonly considered form of viral transformation and includes many cancers and diseases, such as HIV, Hepatitis B, and T-cell Leukemia virus type I.

=== Viral oncogenesis ===
As many as 20% of human tumors are caused by viruses. Some such viruses that are commonly recognized include HPV, T-cell Leukemia virus type I, and hepatitis B.

Viral oncogenesis are most common with DNA and RNA tumor viruses, most frequently the retroviruses. There are two types of oncogenic retroviruses: acute transforming viruses and non-acute transforming viruses. Acute transforming viruses induce a rapid tumor growth since they carry viral oncogenes in their DNA/RNA to induce such growth. An example of an acute transforming virus is the Rous Sarcoma Virus (RSV) that carry the v-src oncogene. v-Src is part of the c-src, which is a cellular proto-oncogene that stimulates rapid cell growth and expansion. A non-acute transforming virus on the other hand induces a slow tumor growth, since it does not carry any viral oncogenes. It induces tumor growth by transcriptionally activating the proto-oncogenes particularly the long terminal repeat (LTR) in the proto-oncogenes.

Viral Oncogenesis through transformation can occur via 2 mechanisms:

1. The tumor virus can introduce and express a "transforming" gene either through the integration of DNA or RNA into the host genome.
2. The tumor virus can alter expression on preexisting genes of the host.

One or both of these mechanisms can occur in the same host cell.

==== Hepatitis B ====
The Hepatitis B viral protein X is believed to cause hepatocellular carcinoma through transformation, typically of liver cells. The viral DNA is incorporated into the host cell's genome causing rapid cell replication and tumor growth.

==== Papillomaviruses ====
Papillomaviruses typically target epithelial cells and cause everything from warts to cervical cancer. When human papillomavirus (HPV) transforms a cell, it interferes with the function of cellular proteins while degrading other cellular proteins.

==== Herpesviruses ====
The herpesviruses, Kaposi's sarcoma-associated herpesvirus and Epstein-Barr virus, are believed to cause cancer in humans, such as Kaposi's sarcoma, Burkitt's lymphoma, and nasopharyngeal carcinoma. Although genes have been identified in these viruses that cause transformation, the manner in which the virus transforms and replicates the host cell is not understood.

==== Retroviruses ====
The retroviruses include T-cell Leukemia virus type I, HIV, and Rous Sarcoma Virus (RSV). The viral gene tax is expressed when the T-cell Leukemia virus transforms a cell altering the expression of cellular growth control genes and causing the transformed cells to become cancerous. HIV works differently by not directly causing cells to become cancerous but by instead making those infected more susceptible to lymphoma and Kaposi's sarcoma. Many other retroviruses contain the three genes, gag, pol, and env, which do not directly cause transformation or tumor formation.

=== HIV ===
Human immunodeficiency virus is a viral infection that targets the lymph nodes. HIV binds to the immune CD4 cell and reverse transcriptase alters the host cell genome to allow integration of the viral DNA via integrase. The virus replicates using the host cell's machinery and then leaves the cell to infect additional cells via budding.

== Medical Applications ==
There are many applications in which viral transformation can be artificially induced in a cell culture in order to treat an illness or other condition. A cell culture is infected with a virus causing the transformation; transformed cells can then be used to either produce treatments or be directly introduced into the body.

=== Personalized type I interferons ===
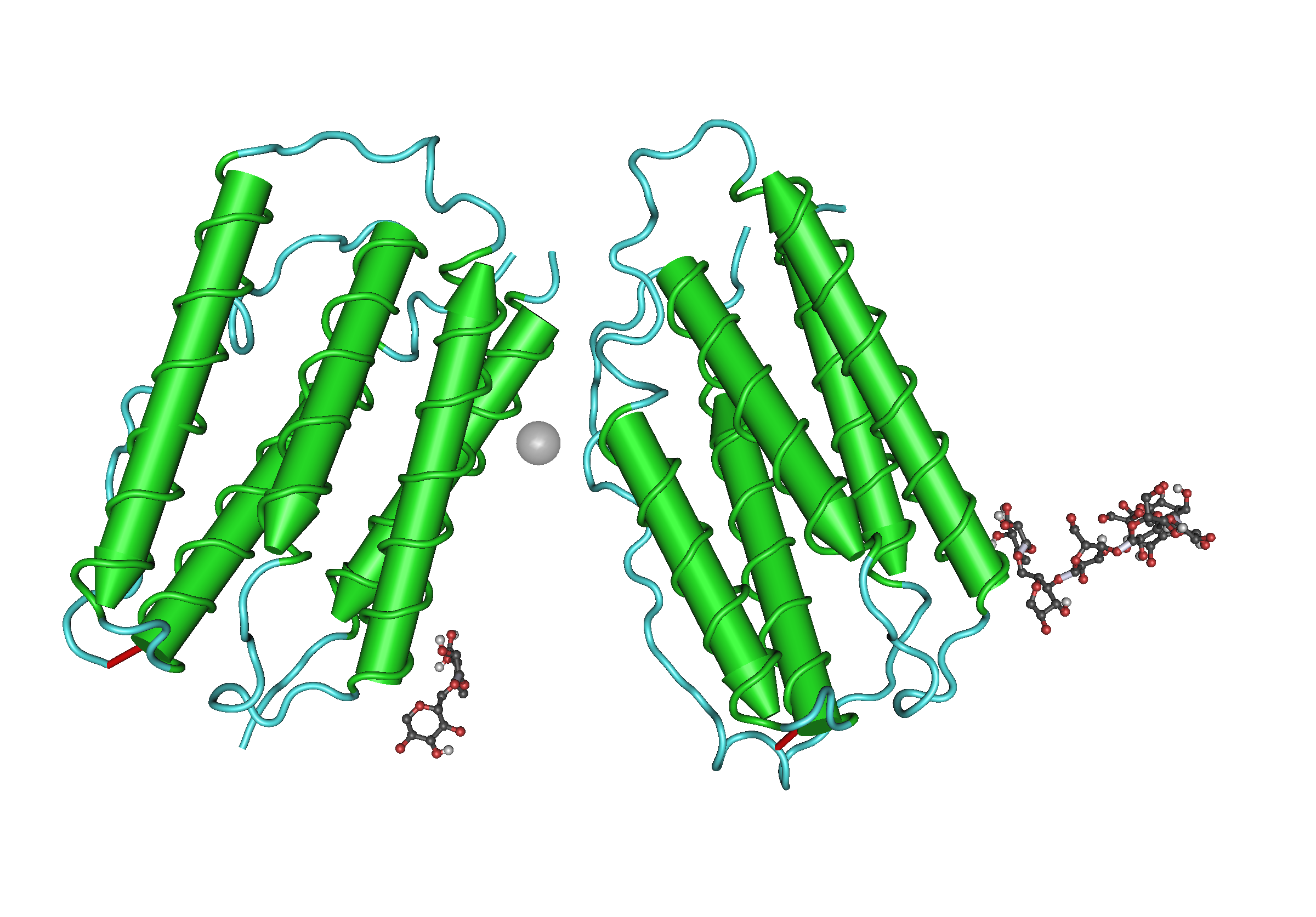
Figure 4: Type I Human Interferon

Type I interferons (IFNs) are used to treat a wide variety of medical conditions including hepatitis C, cancers, viral and inflammatory diseases. IFNs can either be extracted from a natural source, such as cultured human cells or blood leukocytes, or they can be manufactured with recombinant DNA technologies. Most of these IFN treatments have a low response rate.

The use of viral transformation of the Epstein-Barr virus (EBV) has been recommended to create personalized IFNs. In this process, primary B lymphocytes are transformed with EBV. These cells can then be used to produce IFNs specific for the patient from which the B lymphocytes were extracted. This personalization decreases the likelihood of an antibody response and therefore increases the effectiveness of the treatment.

=== Cancer treatments ===
When a virus transforms a cell it often causes cancer by either altering the cells' existing genome or introducing additional genetic material which causes cells to uncontrollably replicate. It is rarely considered that what causes so much harm also has the capability of reversing the process and slowing the cancer growth or even leading to remission. Viruses transform host cells in order to survive and replicate; however, the immune responses of the host cell are typically compromised during transformation making transformed cells more susceptible to other viruses.

The idea of using viruses to treat cancers was first introduced in 1951 when a 4-year-old boy suddenly went into a temporary remission from leukemia while he had chickenpox. This led to research in the 1990s where scientists worked to create a strain of the herpes simplex virus strong enough to infect and transform tumor cells but weak enough to leave healthy cells unharmed. Treating patients with viral transformation has the possibility of treating patients more safely and more effectively than using traditional methods, such as chemotherapy. Viruses used in the treatment of cancer gain strength and increase their effectiveness as the multiply in the body while causing only minor side effects, such as nausea, fatigue, and aches.

== See also ==
- Transduction
- Transfection
- Transgenesis
