= FGT =

FGT may refer to:

== Transport ==
- Ascari FGT, a prototype race car model
- Faygate railway station, England (CRS code: FGT)
- Free Gauge Train, Japanese variable-gauge trains

== Other uses ==
- Finsbury Growth & Income Trust, a British investment fund (LSE ticker: FGT)
- Foster–Greer–Thorbecke indices, a family of poverty metrics
- Four-gamete test, in phylogenetics
