= Transgenesis =

Introduction of foreign genetic material into a host

Transgenesis is the process of introducing an exogenous gene—called a transgene—into a living organism so that the organism will exhibit a new property and transmit that property to its offspring. Transgenesis can be facilitated by liposomes, enzymes, plasmid vectors, viral vectors, pronuclear injection, protoplast fusion, and ballistic DNA injection. Transgenesis can occur in nature.

Transgenic organisms are able to express foreign genes because the genetic code is similar for all organisms. This means that a specific DNA sequence will code for the same protein in all organisms. Due to this similarity in protein sequence, scientists can cut DNA at these common protein points and add other genes. An example of this is the "super mice" of the 1980s. These mice were able to produce the human protein tPA to treat blood clots.

== Using plasmids from bacteria ==
The most common type of transgenesis research is done with bacteria and viruses which are able to replicate foreign DNA. The plasmid DNA is cut using restriction enzymes, while the DNA to be copied is also cut with the same restriction enzyme, producing complementary sticky-ends. This allows the foreign DNA to hybridise with the plasmid DNA and be sealed by DNA ligase enzyme, creating a genetic code not normally found in nature. Altered DNA is inserted into plasmids for replication.

== In nature ==
A study published in 2015 by scientists from Ghent University and the International Potato Center found that the genome of cultivated sweet potatoes contains sequences of DNA from Agrobacterium, with genes being actively expressed by the plants. The discovery of the transgenes was made while performing metagenomic analysis of the sweet potato genome for viral diseases. Transgenes were observed both in the sweet potato's closely related wild relatives, and also were found in more distantly related wild species. This observation makes cultivated sweet potatoes the first known example of a naturally transgenic food crop.

== Gene transfer technology ==
=== DNA microinjection ===
The Desired gene construct is injected in the pronucleus of a reproductive cell using a glass needle around 0.5 to 5 micrometers in diameter. The manipulated cell is cultured in vitro to develop to a specific embryonic phase, is then transferred to a recipient female. DNA microinjection does not have a high success rate (roughly 2% of all injected subjects), even if the new DNA is incorporated in the genome, if it is not accepted by the germ-line the new traits will not appear in their offspring. If DNA is injected in multiple sites the chances of over-expression increase.

=== Retrovirus-mediated gene transfer ===
A retrovirus is a virus that carries its genetic material in the form of RNA rather than DNA. Retroviruses are used as vectors to transfer genetic material into the host cell. The result is a chimera, an organism consisting of tissues or parts of diverse genetic constitution. Chimeras are inbred for as many as 20 generations until homozygous genetic offspring are born.

=== Restriction enzyme mediated integration ===
Restriction enzyme mediated integration (REMI) is a technique for integrating DNA (linearised plasmid) into the genome sites that have been generated by the same restriction enzyme used for the DNA linearisation. The plasmid integration occurs at the corresponding sites in the genome, often by regenerating the recognition sites by same the restriction enzyme used for plasmid linearisation.

=== Stem cell transgenesis ===
==== Multipotent stem cell transgenesis ====
Multipotent stem cells can only differentiate into a limited number of therapeutically useful cell types, nevertheless their safety and relative lack of complexity to us has resulted in the vast majority of current personalized cellular therapeutics involving multipotent stem cells (typically mesenchymal stem cells from adipose tissue).

==== Pluripotent stem cell transgenesis ====
Transgenic vectors can be delivered randomly, or targeted to a specific genomic location, such as a safe harbor. Scientists have performed research and technology development to provide the tools necessary to permit safe and effective pluripotent stem cell (PSC) transgenesis.

==== Totipotent stem cell transgenesis ====
The manipulated gene construct is inserted into totipotent stem cells, cells which can develop into any specialized cell. Cells containing the desired DNA are incorporated into the host’s embryo, resulting in a chimeric animal. Unlike the other two methods of injection which require live transgenic offspring for testing, embryonic cell transfer can be tested at the cell stage.

== Applications ==
=== Pharming ===
Pharming, a portmanteau of "farming" and "pharmaceutical", refers to the use of genetic engineering to insert genes that code for useful pharmaceuticals into host animals or plants that would otherwise not express those genes. Pharming has gained application in biotechnology since the development of transgenic "super mice" in 1982. "Super mice" were genetically altered to produce the human drug, tPA (tissue plasminogen activator to treat blood clots), in 1987. Since then, "super mice" pharming has come a long way. Using RNA interference, scientists have produced a cow whose milk contains increased amounts of casein, a protein used to make cheese and other foods, and almost no beta-lactoglobulin, a component in milk whey protein that causes allergies.

Pharming examples:

- Haemoglobin as a blood substitute
- Human protein C anticoagulant
- Alpha-1 antitrypsin (AAT) for treatment of AAT deficiency
- Insulin for diabetes treatment
- Vaccines (antigens)
- Growth hormones for treatment of deficiencies
- Factor VIII blood clotting factor
- Factor IX blood clotting factor
- Fibrinogen blood clotting factor
- Lactoferrin as an infant formula additive

=== Medical ===
Transgenesis can be used to neutralize genes that would normally prevent xenotransplantation. For example, a protein found in pigs can cause humans to reject their transplanted organs. This protein can be replaced by a similar human genome to prevent the rejection.

== Ethical concerns ==
Transgenesis has created certain ethical concerns. Examples include rights for animals that have been improved intellectually, legal ramifications, and possible health risks.

== Diagram ==
A diagram comparing the genetic changes achieved through conventional plant breeding, transgenesis and cisgenesis

.

Note: New genotypes created with transgenic technologies also require multiple backcrossings. Furthermore, backcrossing does not account for the majority of time required to create, field test and release/commercialize a new variety.

== See also ==
- Horizontal gene transfer
