= Viral vector =

Biotechnology for gene delivery

A 2021 U.S. Centers for Disease Control and Prevention poster on the COVID-19 viral vector vaccines

A viral vector is a modified virus designed to deliver genetic material into cells. This process can be performed inside an organism or in cell culture. Viral vectors have widespread applications in basic research, agriculture, and medicine.

Viruses have evolved specialized molecular mechanisms to transport their genomes into infected hosts, a process termed transduction. This capability has been exploited for use as viral vectors, which may integrate their genetic cargo—the transgene—into the host genome, although non-integrative vectors are also commonly used. In addition to agriculture and laboratory research, viral vectors are widely applied in gene therapy: as of 2022, all approved gene therapies were viral vector-based. Further, compared to traditional vaccines, the intracellular antigen expression enabled by viral vector vaccines offers more robust immune activation.

Many types of viruses have been developed into viral vector platforms, ranging from retroviruses to cytomegaloviruses. Different viral vector classes vary widely in strengths and limitations, suiting some to specific applications. For instance, relatively non-immunogenic and integrative vectors like lentiviral vectors are commonly employed for gene therapy. Chimeric viral vectors—such as hybrid vectors with qualities of both bacteriophages and eukaryotic viruses—have also been developed.

Viral vectors were first created in 1972 by Paul Berg. Further development was temporarily halted by a recombinant DNA research moratorium following the Asilomar Conference and stringent National Institutes of Health regulations. Once lifted, the 1980s saw both the first recombinant viral vector gene therapy and the first viral vector vaccine. Although the 1990s saw significant advances in viral vectors, clinical trials had a number of setbacks, culminating in Jesse Gelsinger's death. However, in the 21st century, viral vectors experienced a resurgence and have been globally approved for the treatment of various diseases. They have been administered to billions of patients, notably during the COVID-19 pandemic.

== Characteristics ==
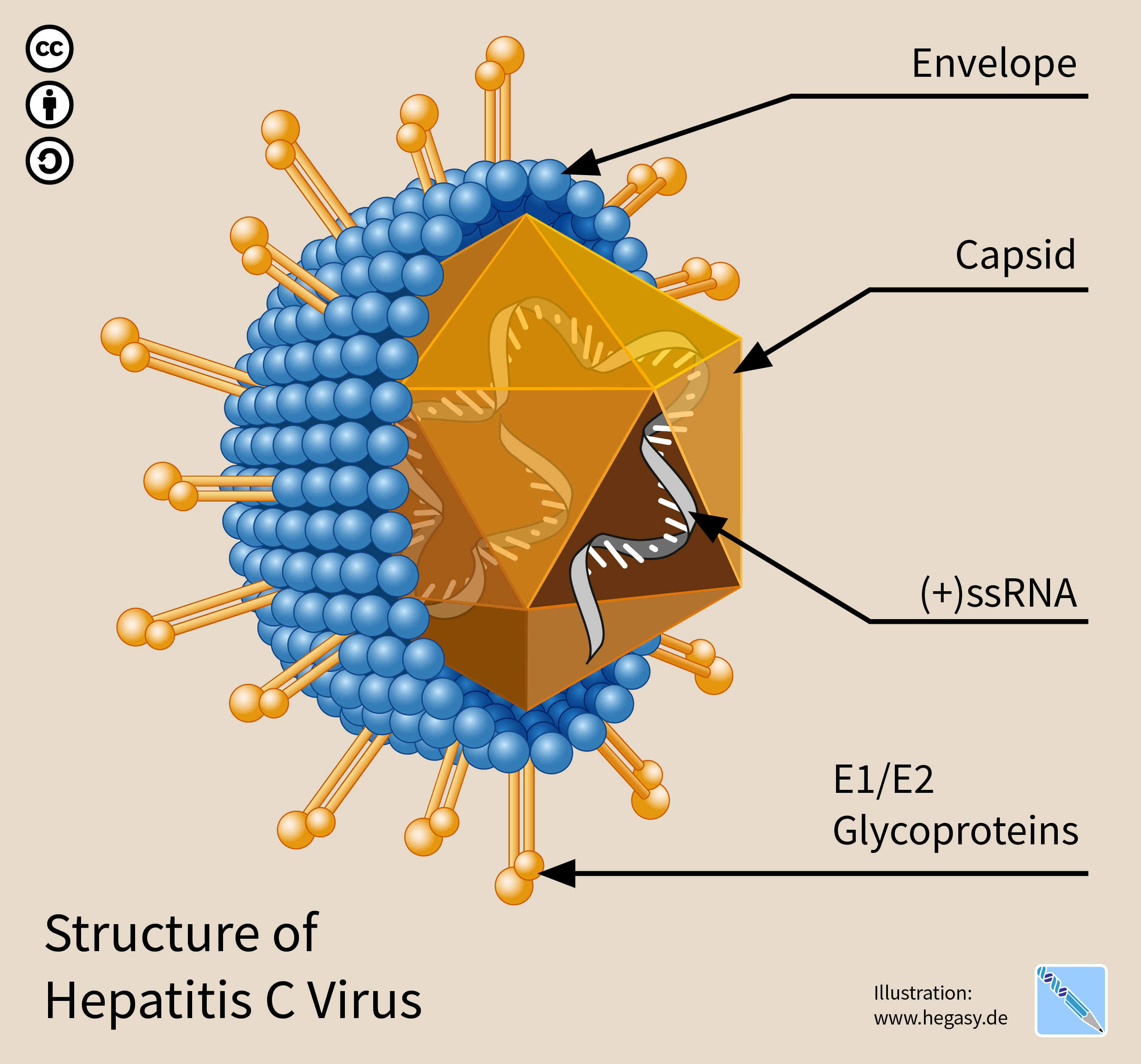
Structure of a virus, specifically the hepatitis C virus

Viruses, infectious agents composed of a protein coat that encloses a genome, are the most numerous biological entities on Earth. As they cannot replicate independently, they must infect cells and hijack the host's replication machinery in order to produce copies of themselves. Viruses do this by inserting their genome—which can be DNA or RNA, either single-stranded or double-stranded—into the host. Some viruses may integrate their genome directly into that of the host in the form of a provirus.

This ability to transfer foreign genetic material has been exploited by genetic engineers to create viral vectors, which can transduce the desired transgene into a target cell. Viral vectors consists of three components:

1. A protein capsid and sometimes an envelope that encapsidates the genetic payload. This determines the range of cell types that the vector infects, termed its tropism.
2. A genetic payload: the transgene that results in the desired effect when expressed.
3. A "regulatory cassette" that controls transgene expression, whether integrated into a host chromosome or as an episome. The cassette comprises an enhancer, a promoter, and auxiliary elements.

== Applications ==
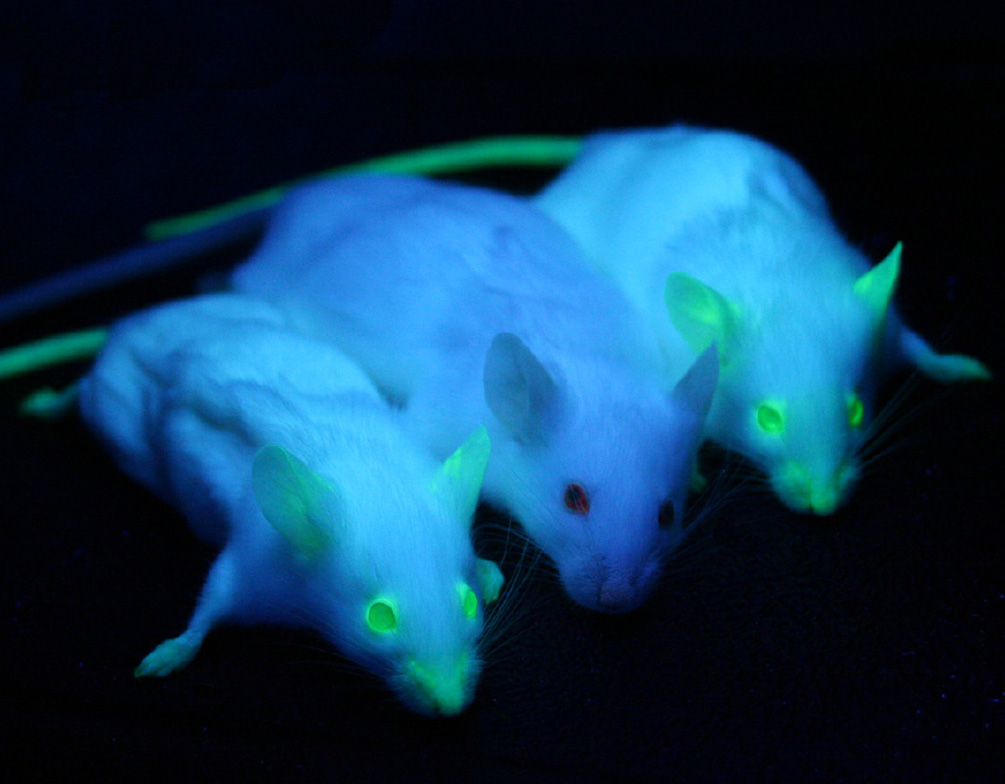
Mice transduced by a lentiviral vector fluoresce under UV-illumination

=== Basic research ===
Viral vectors are routinely used in a basic research setting and can introduce genes encoding, for instance, complementary DNA, short hairpin RNA, or CRISPR/Cas9 systems for gene editing. Viral vectors are employed for cellular reprogramming, like inducing pluripotent stem cells or differentiating adult somatic cells into different cell types. Researchers also use viral vectors to create transgenic mice and rats for experiments. Viral vectors can be used for in vivo imaging via the introduction of a reporter gene. Further, transduction of stem cells can permit the tracing of cell lineage during development.

=== Gene therapy ===
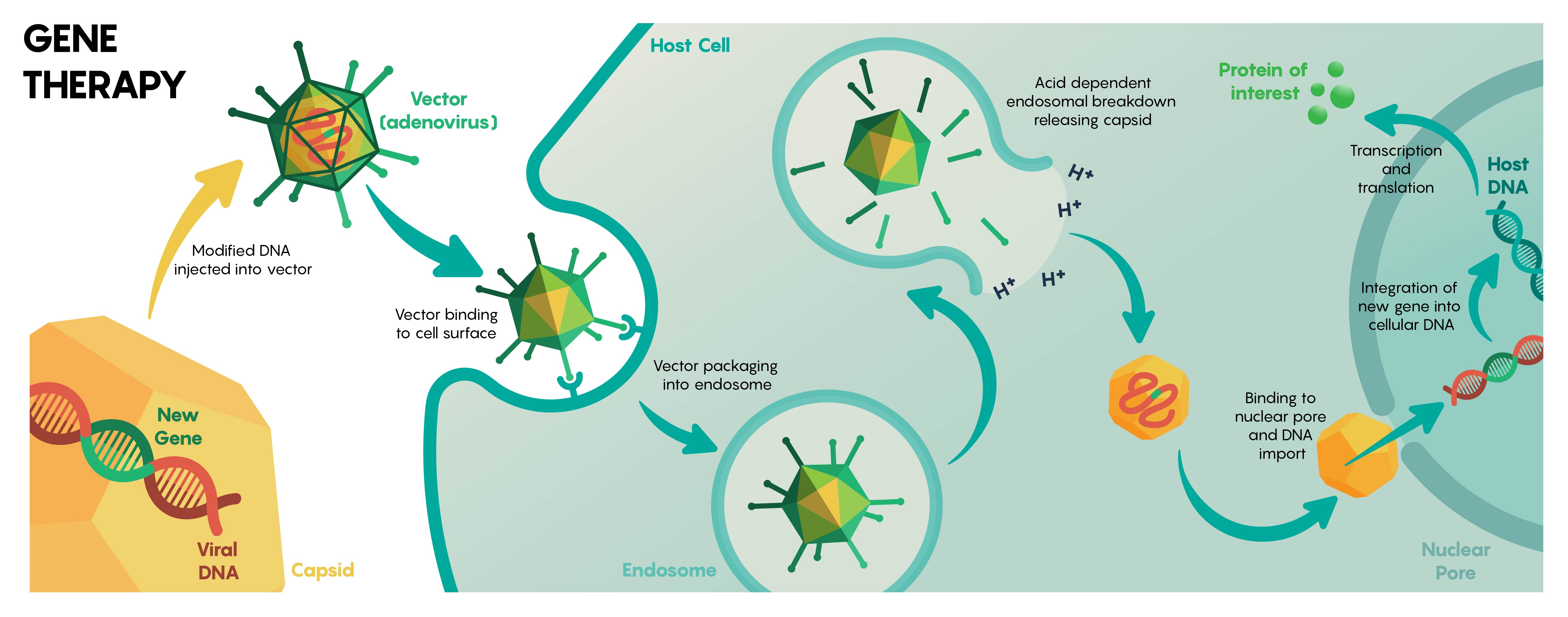
Viral vector-based gene therapy

Gene therapy seeks to modulate or otherwise affect gene expression via the introduction of a therapeutic transgene. Gene therapy by viral vectors can be performed by in vivo delivery by directly administering the vector to the patient, or ex vivo by extracting cells from the patient, transducing them, and then reintroducing the modified cells into the patient. Viral vector gene therapies may also be used for plants, tentatively enhancing crop performance or promoting sustainable production.

There are four broad categories of gene therapy: gene replacement, gene silencing, gene addition, or gene editing. Relative to other non-integrative gene therapy approaches, transgenes introduced by viral vectors offer multi-year long expression.

=== Vaccines ===
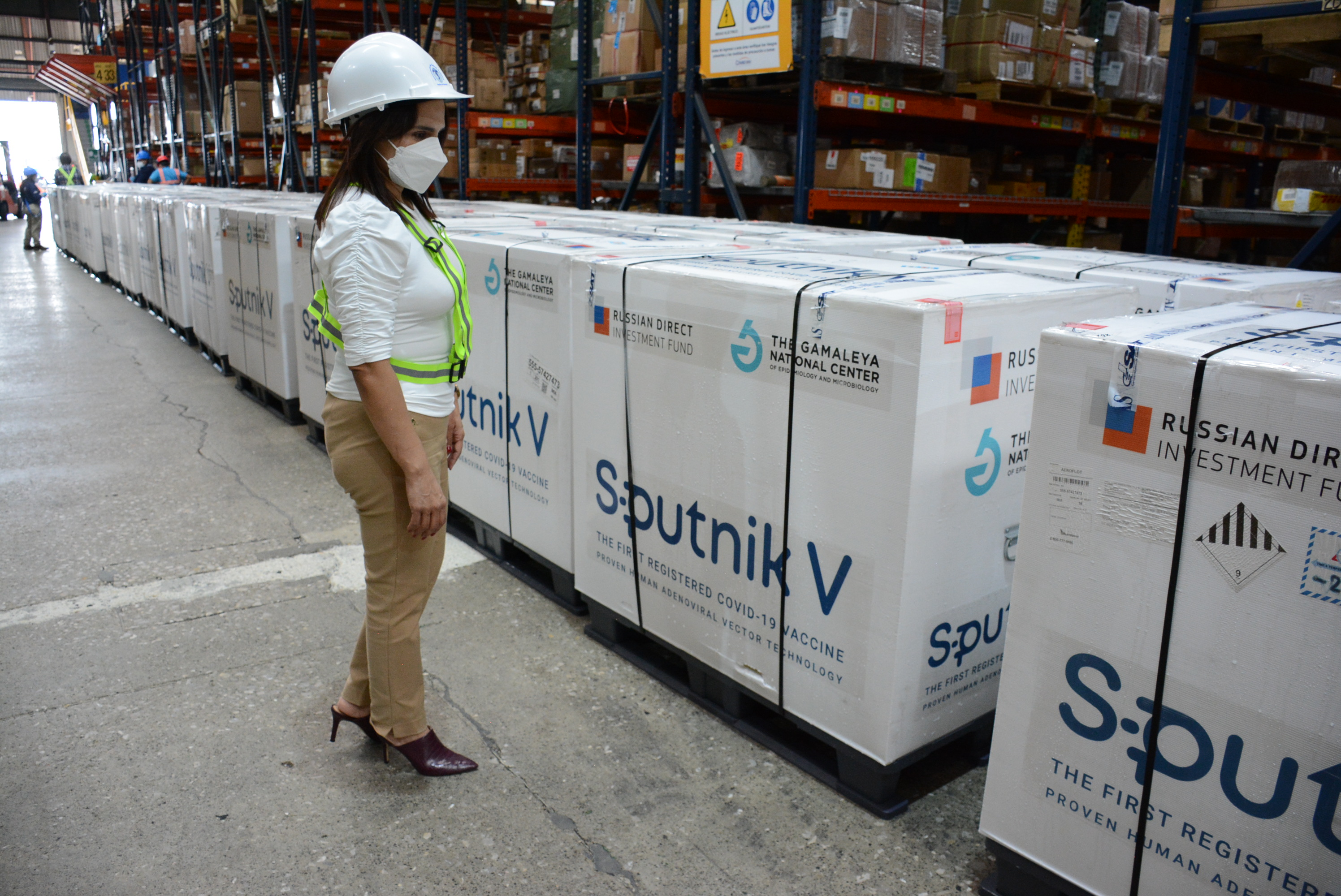
Shipments of the Russian-made Sputnik V COVID-19 vaccine, an adenoviral vector, are seen in Guatemala in 2021.

For use as vaccine platforms, viral vectors can be engineered to carry a specific antigen associated with an infectious disease or a tumor antigen. Conventional vaccines are not suitable for protection against some pathogens due to unique immune evasion strategies and differences in pathogenesis. Viral vector-based vaccines, for instance, could eventually offer immunity against HIV-1 and malaria.

While traditional subunit vaccines elicit a humoral response, viral vectors allow for intracellular antigen expression that activates MHC pathways via both direct and crosspresentation pathways. This induces a robust adaptive immune response. Viral vector vaccines also have intrinsic adjuvant properties via innate immune system activation and the expression of pathogen-associated molecular patterns, negating the need for any additional adjuvant. In addition to a more robust immune response in comparison to other vaccine types, viral vectors offer efficient gene transduction and can target specific cell types. Pre-existing immunity to the virus used as the vector, however, can be a significant issue.

Prior to 2020, viral vector vaccines were widely administered but confined to veterinary medicine. In the global response to the COVID-19 pandemic, viral vector vaccines played a fundamental role and were administered to billions of people, particularly in low and middle-income nations.

== Types ==
=== Retroviruses ===
Retroviruses—enveloped RNA viruses—are popular viral vector platforms due to their ability to integrate genetic material into the host genome. Retroviral vectors comprise two general classes: gamma retroviral and lentiviral vectors. The fundamental difference between the two are that gamma retroviral vectors can only infect dividing cells, while lentiviral vectors can infect both dividing and resting cells. Notably, retroviral genomes are composed of single-stranded RNA and must be converted to proviral double-stranded DNA, a process known as reverse transcription—before it is integrated into the host genome via viral proteins like integrase.

The most commonly used gammaretroviral vector is a modified Moloney murine leukemia virus (MMLV), able to transduce various mammalian cell types. MMLV vectors have been associated with some cases of carcinogenesis. Gammaretroviral vectors have been successfully applied to ex vivo hematopoietic stem cell to treat multiple genetic diseases.

==== Lentiviral vectors ====
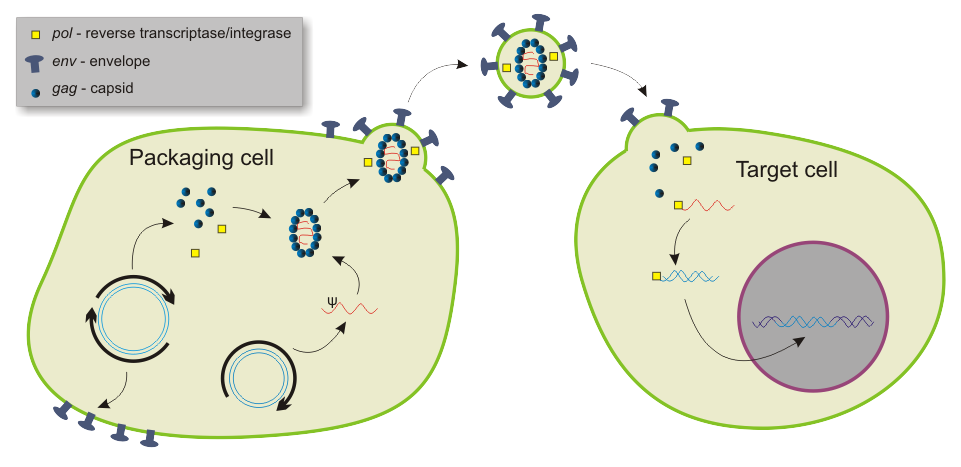
Packaging and transduction by a lentiviral vector.

Most lentiviral vectors are derived from human immunodeficiency virus type 1 (HIV-1), although modified simian immunodeficiency virus (SIV), the feline immunodeficiency virus (FIV), and the equine infectious anaemia virus (EIAV) have also been utilized. As all functional genes are removed or otherwise mutated, the vectors are not cytopathic and can be engineered to be non-integrative.

Lentiviral vectors are able to carry up to 10 kb of foreign genetic material, although 3-4 kb was reported as optimal as of 2023. Relative to other viral vectors, lentiviral vectors possess the greatest transduction capacity, due to the formation of a three-stranded "DNA flap" during retro-transcription of the single-strand lentiviral RNA to DNA within the host.

Although largely non-inflammatory, lentiviral vectors can induce robust adaptive immune responses by memory-type cytotoxic T cells and T helper cells. This is largely due to lentiviral vectors' high tropism for dendritic cells, which activate T cells. However, they can infect all types of antigen-presenting cells. Moreover, as they are the only retroviral vectors able to efficiently transduce both dividing and non-dividing cells, make them the most promising vaccine platforms. They have also been trialed as vaccines against cancer.

Lentiviral vectors have been used as in vivo therapies, such as directly treating genetic diseases like haemophilia B and for ex vivo treatments like immune cell modification in CAR T cell therapy. In 2017, the US Food and Drug Administration (FDA) approved tisagenlecleucel, a lentiviral vector, for acute lymphoblastic leukaemia.

=== Adenoviruses ===
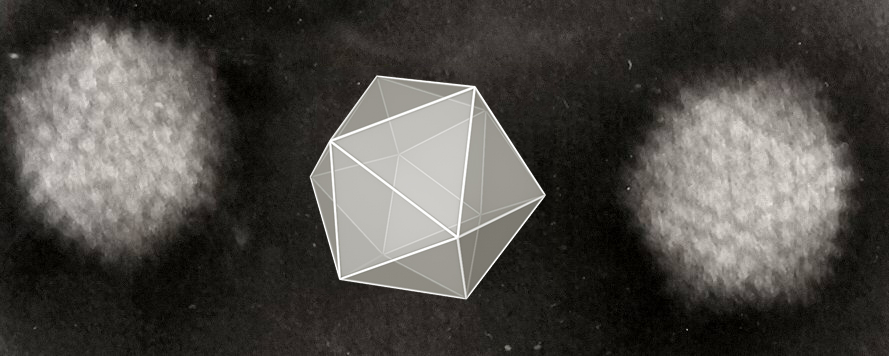
Adenoviruses (visualized via electron micrograph at left and right and depicted graphically at center) are commonly used as viral vector platforms. Note the icosahedron capsid structure.

Adenoviruses are double-stranded DNA viruses belonging to the family Adenoviridae. Their relatively large genomes, of approximately 30–45 kb, make them ideal candidates for genetic delivery; newer adenoviral vectors can carry up to 37 kb of foreign genetic material. Adenoviral vectors display high transduction efficiency and transgene expression, and can infect both dividing and non-dividing cells.

The adenoviral capsid, an icosahedron, features a fibre "knob" at each of its 12 vertices. These fibre proteins mediate cell entry—greatly affecting efficacy and contribute to its broad tropism—notably via coxsackie–adenovirus receptors (CARs). Adenoviral vectors can induce robust innate and adaptive immune responses. Its strong immunogenicity is particularly due to the transduction of dendritic cells (DC), upregulating the expression of both MHC I and II molecules and activating the DCs. They have a strong adjuvant effect, as they display several pathogen-associated molecular patterns. One disadvantage is that pre-existing immunity to adenovirus serotypes is common, reducing efficacy. The use of chimpanzee adenoviruses may circumvent this issue.

While the activation of both innate and adaptive immune responses is an obstacle for many therapeutic applications, it makes adenenoviral vectors an ideal vaccine platform. The global response to the COVID-19 pandemic saw the development and use of multiple adenoviral vector vaccines, including Sputnik V, the Oxford–AstraZeneca vaccine, and the Janssen vaccine.

=== Adeno-associated viruses ===
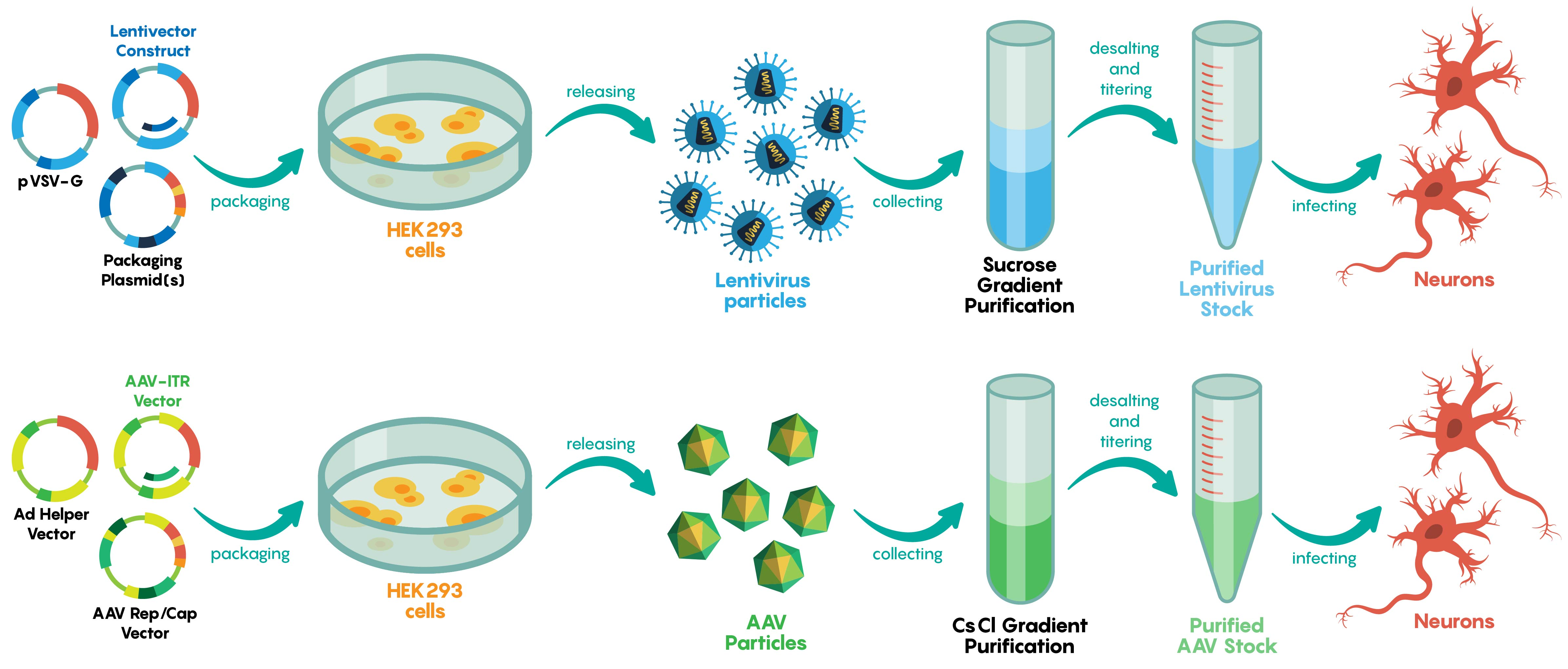
Lentivirus (upper panel) – To produce lentiviruses with the gene of interest as the lentiviral DNA construct, first transfect cells with a packaging plasmid and the envelope vector (VSVG). Adeno Associated Virus (AAV) (lower panel) – To produce AAV, package a gene of interest into the AAV-ITR vector and transfect cells with a Helper vector and the Rep/Cap DNA integration vector.

Adeno-associated viruses (AAVs) are relatively small single-stranded DNA viruses belonging to Parvoviridae and, like lentiviral vectors, AAVs can infect both dividing and non-dividing cells. AAVs, however, require the presence of a "helper virus" such as an adenovirus or herpes simplex virus to replicate within the host, although it can do so independently if cellular stress is induced or the helper virus genes are carried by the vector.

AAVs insert themselves into a specific site in the host genome, particularly AAVS1 on chromosome 19 in humans. However, recombinant AAVs have been designed that do not integrate. These are instead stored as episomes that, in non-dividing cells, can last for years. One disadvantage is that they are not able to carry large amounts of foreign genetic materials. Furthermore, the need to express the complementary strand for its single-stranded genome may delay transgene expression.

As of 2020, 11 different AAV serotypes—differing by capsid structure and consequently by tropism—had been identified. The tropism of adeno-associated viral vectors can be tailored by creating recombinant versions from multiple serotypes, termed pseudotyping. Due to their ability to infect and induce longlasting effects within nondividing cells, AAVs are commonly used in basic neuroscience research. Following the approval of the AAV Alipogene tiparvovec in Europe in 2012, in 2017, the FDA approved the first AAV-based in vivo gene therapy—voretigene neparvovec—which treated RPE65-associated Leber congenital amaurosis. As of 2020, 230 clinical trials using AAV-based treatments were either underway or had been completed.

=== Vaccinia ===
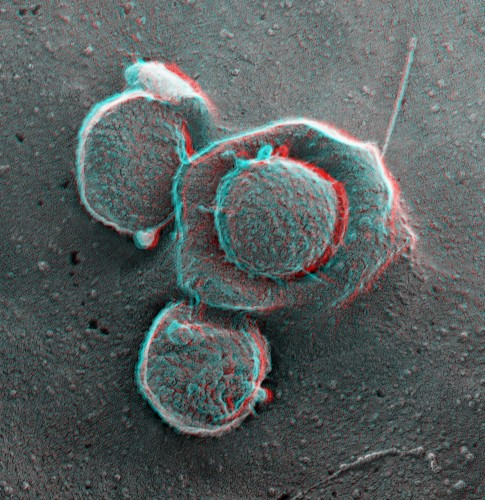
An electron micrograph of vaccinia

Vaccinia virus, a poxvirus, is another promising candidate for viral vector development. Its use as the smallpox vaccine—first reported by Edward Jenner in 1798—led to the eradication of smallpox and demonstrated vaccinia as safe and effective in humans. Moreover, manufacturing procedures developed to mass-produce smallpox vaccine stockpiles may expedite vaccinia viral vector production.

Vaccinia possesses a large DNA genome and can consequently carry up to 40 kb of foreign DNA. Further, vaccinia are unlikely to integrate into the host genome, decreasing the chance of carcinogenesis. Attenuated strains—replicating and non-replicating—have been developed. Although widely characterized due to its use against smallpox, as of 2019 the function of 50 percent of the vaccinia genome was unknown. This may lead to unpredictable effects.

As a vaccine platform, vaccinia vectors display highly effective transgene expression and create a robust immune response. The virus fast-acting: its life cycle produces mature progeny vaccinia within 6 hours, and has three viral spread mechanisms. Vaccinia also has an adjuvant effect, activating a strong innate response via toll-like receptors. A significant disadvantage that can reduce its efficacy, however, is pre-existing immunity against vaccinia in those who received the smallpox vaccine.

=== Herpesviruses ===
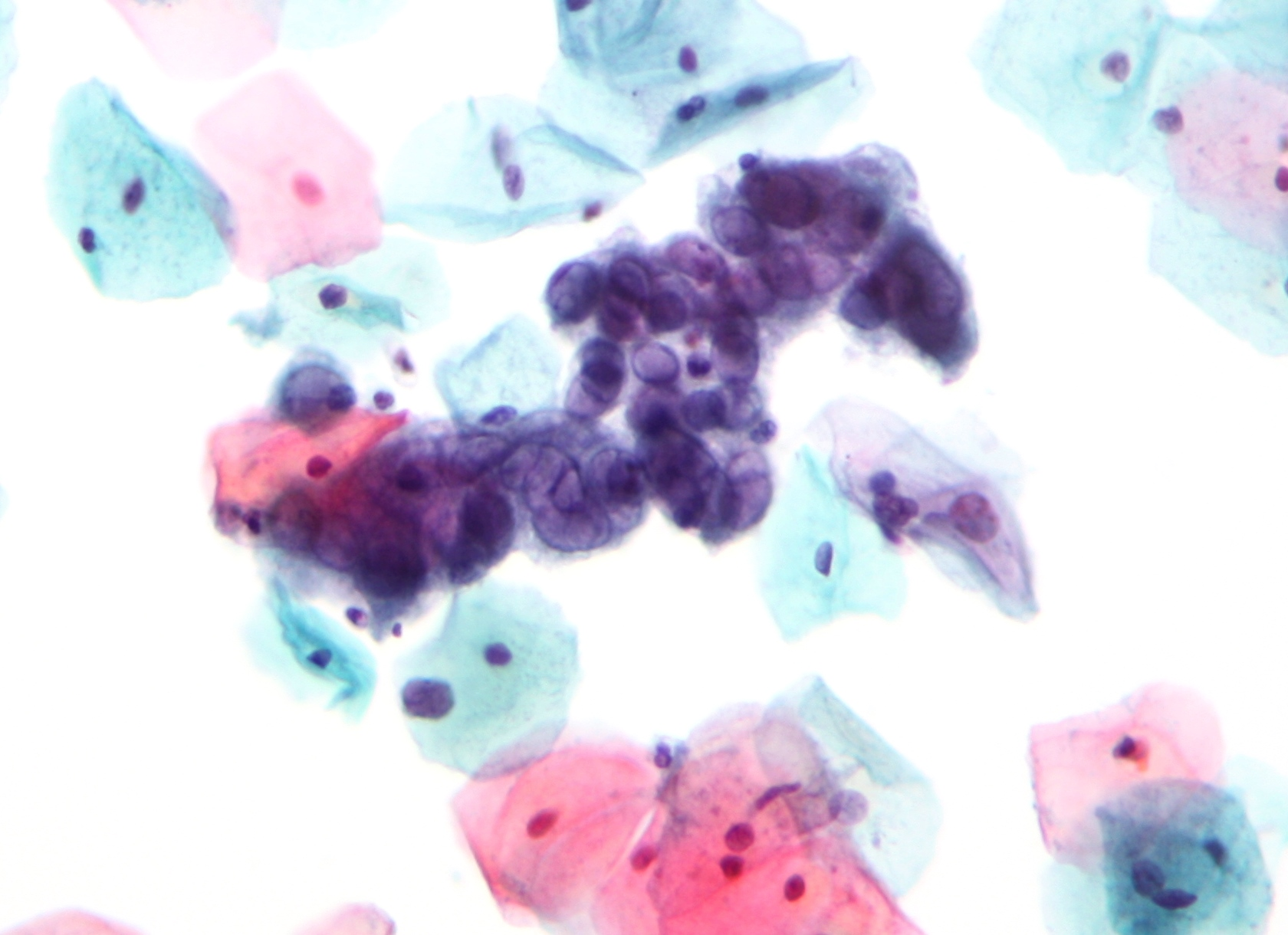
Herpes simplex virus I

Of the nine herpesviruses that infect humans, herpes simplex virus 1 (HSV-1) is the most well characterized and most commonly used as a viral vector. HSV-1 offers several advantages: it has broad tropism and can deliver therapeutics via specialized expression systems. Moreover, HSV-1 can cross the blood brain barrier if medically-disrupted, enabling it to target neurological diseases. Also, HSV-1 does not integrate into the host genome and can carry large amounts of foreign DNA. The former feature prevents harmful mutagenesis, as can occur with retroviral and adeno-associated vectors. Replication-deficient strains have been developed.

In 2015, talimogene laherparepvec—an HSV-1 vector that triggers an anti-tumor immune response—was approved by the FDA to treat melanoma. As of 2020, HSV-1 vectors have been experimentally applied against sarcomas and cancers of the brain, colon, prostate, and skin.

Cytomegalovirus (CMV), a herpesvirus, has also been developed for use as a viral vector. CMV can infect most cell types and can thus proliferate throughout the body. Although a CMV-based vaccine provided significant immunity against SIV—closely related to HIV—in macaques, development of CMV as a reliable vector was reported to still be in early stages as of 2020.

=== Plant viruses ===
Plant viruses are also engineered viral vectors for use in agriculture, horticulture, and biologic production. These vectors have been employed for a range of applications, from increasing the aesthetic quality of ornamental plants to pest biocontrol, rapid expression of recombinant proteins and peptides, and to accelerate crop breeding. The use of engineered plant viruses has been proposed to enhance crop performance and promote sustainable production.

Replicating virus-based vectors are typically used. RNA viruses used for monocots include wheat streak mosaic virus and barley stripe mosaic virus and, for dicots, tobacco rattle virus. Single-stranded DNA viruses like geminiviruses have also been utilized. Viral vectors can be administered to plants via several pathways termed "agro-inoculation", including via rubbing, a biolistic delivery system, agrospray, agroinjection, and even via insect vectors. However, Agrobacterium-mediated delivery of viral vectors—in which bacteria are transformed with plasmid DNA encoding the viral vector construct—is the most common approach.

=== Bacteriophages ===
Chimeric vectors combining both bacteriophages and eukaryotic viruses have been developed and are capable of infecting eukaryotic cells. Unlike eukaryotic virus-based vectors, such bacteriophage vectors have no innate tropism for eukaryotic cells, allowing them to be engineered to be highly specific for cancer cells.

Bacteriophage vectors are also commonly used in molecular biology. For instance, bacteriophage vectors are used in phage-assisted continuous evolution, promoting rapid mutagenesis of bacteria. Although limited to mycobacteriophages and some phages of gram-negative bacteria, bacteriophages can be used for direct cloning.

== Manufacture ==
A typical suspension culture bioreactor

Viral vector manufacturing methods often vary by vector, although most utilize an adherent or suspension-based system with mammalian cells. For viral vector production on a smaller, laboratory setting, static cell culture systems like Petri dishes are typically used.

Those techniques used in the laboratory are difficult to scale, requiring different approaches on an industrial scale. Large single-use disposable culture systems and bioreactors are commonly used by manufacturers. Vessels such as those with gas permeable surfaces are used to maximize cell culture density and solution transducing units. Depending on the vessel, viruses can be directly isolated from the supernatant or isolated via chemical lysis of the cultured cells or microfluidization. In 2017, The New York Times reported a manufacturing backlog of inactivated viruses, delaying some gene therapy trials by years.

== History ==
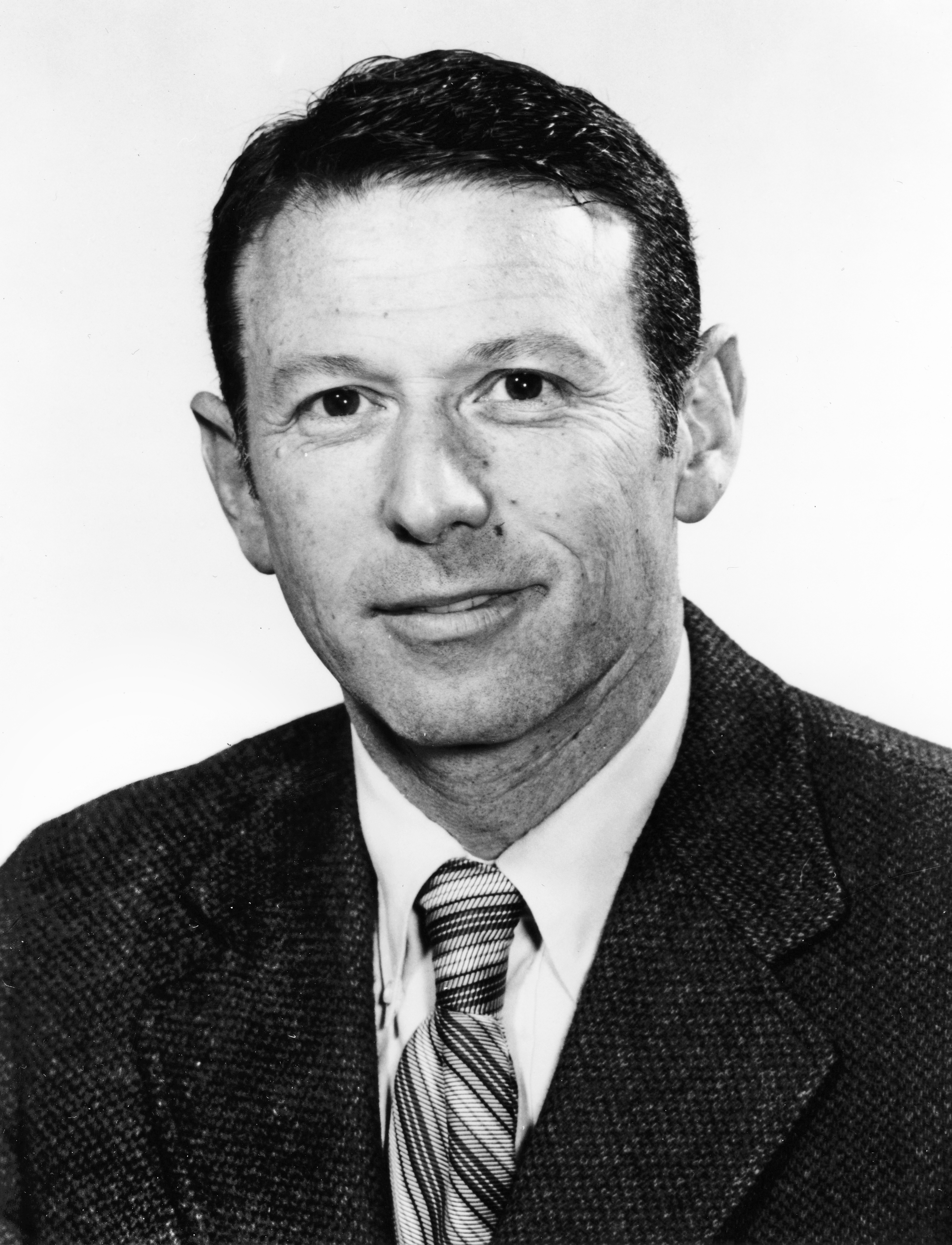
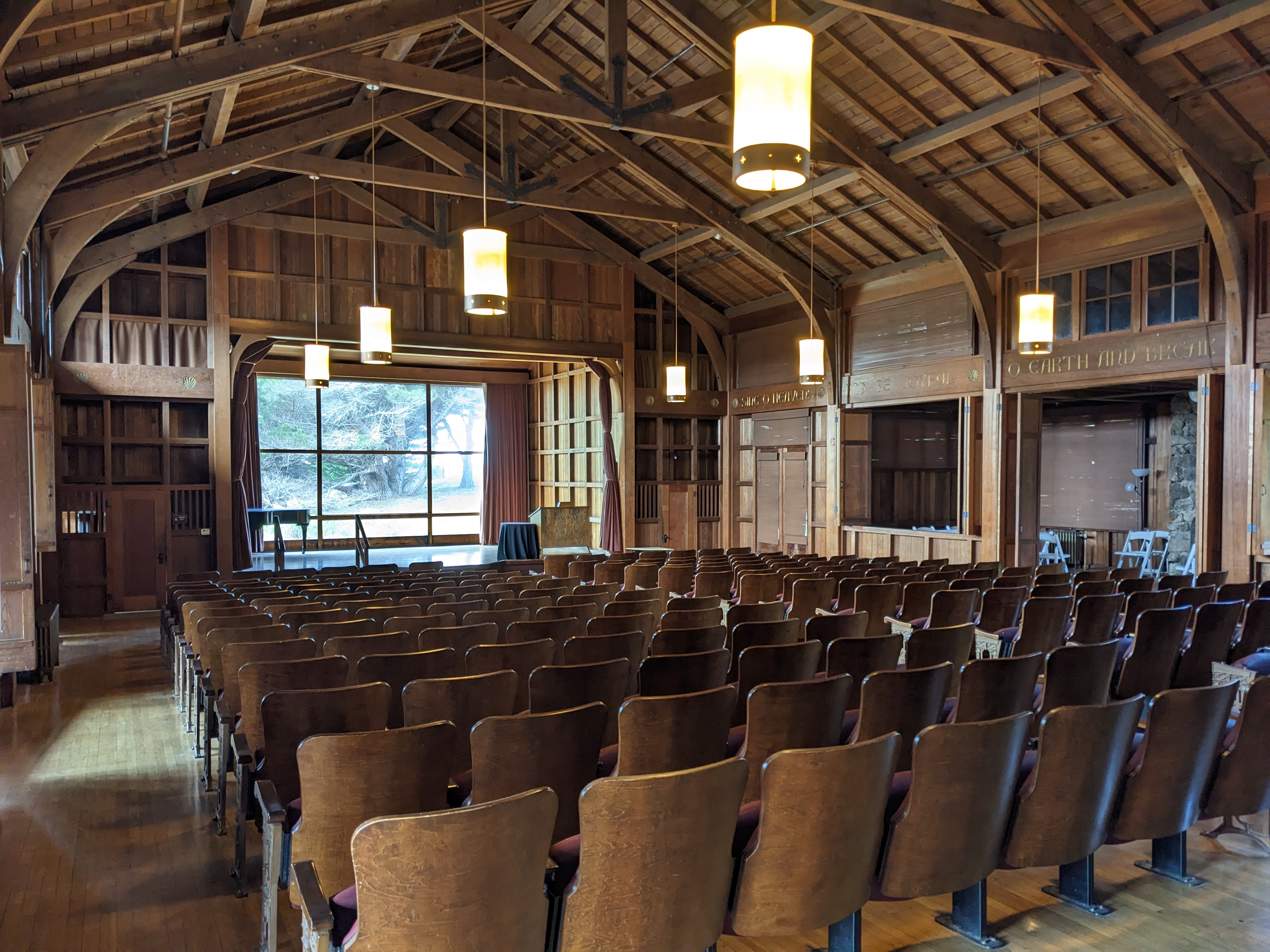
Paul Berg's creation of the first viral vector in 1972 led to the Asilomar Conference, which established a moratorium on recombinant DNA research.

In 1972, Stanford University biochemist Paul Berg developed the first viral vector, incorporating DNA from the lambda phage into the polyomavirus SV40 to infect kidney cells maintained in culture. The implications of this achievement troubled scientists like Robert Pollack, who convinced Berg not to transduce DNA from SV40 into E. coli via a bacteriophage vector. They feared that introducing the purportedly cancer-causing genes of SV40 would create carcinogenic bacterial strains. These concerns and others in the emerging field of recombinant DNA led to the Asilomar Conference of 1975, where attendees agreed to a voluntary moratorium on cloning DNA.

In 1977, the National Institutes of Health (NIH) issued formal guidelines confining viral DNA cloning to rigid BSL-4 conditions, practically preventing such research. However, the NIH loosened these rules in 1979, permitting Bernard Moss to develop a viral vector utilizing vaccinia. In 1982, Moss reported the first use of a viral vector for transient gene expression. The following year, Moss used the vaccinia vector to express a hepatitis B antigen, creating the first viral vector vaccine.

Every realm of medicine has its defining moment, often with a human face attached. Polio had Jonas Salk. In vitro fertilization had Louise Brown, the world's first test-tube baby. Transplant surgery had Barney Clark, the Seattle dentist with the artificial heart. AIDS had Magic Johnson. Now gene therapy has Jesse Gelsinger.

— Sheryl Gay Stolberg, The New York Times Magazine

Although a failed gene therapy attempt utilizing wild-type Shope papilloma virus had been made as early as 1972, Martin Cline attempted the first gene therapy utilizing recombinant DNA in 1980. It proved unsuccessful. In the 1990s, as genetic diseases were further characterized and viral vector technology improved, there was overoptimism about the capabilities the technology. Many clinical trials proved failures. There were some successes, such as the first effective gene therapy for severe combined immunodeficiency (SCID); it employed a retroviral vector.

However, during a 1999 clinical trial at the University of Pennsylvania, Jesse Gelsinger died from a fatal reaction to an adenoviral vector-based gene therapy. It was the first death related to any form of gene therapy. Consequently, the FDA suspended all gene therapy trials at the University of Pennsylvania and investigated 60 others across the US. An anonymous editorial in Nature Medicine noted that it represented a "loss of innocence" for viral vectors. Shortly thereafter, the field's reputation was further damaged when 5 children treated with a SCID gene therapy developed leukemia due to an issue with the retroviral vector. (Note: One child ultimately died. According to Cormac Sheridan, the backlash was unfair as the overall mortality rate for the viral vector therapy was lower than equivalent approaches.)

Viral vectors experienced a resurgence when they were successfully employed for ex vivo hematopoietic gene delivery in clinical settings. In 2003, China approved the first gene therapy for clinical use: Gendicine, an adenoviral vector encoding p53. In 2012, the European Union issued its first approval of a gene therapy, an adeno-associated viral vector. During the COVID-19 pandemic, viral vector vaccines were used to an unprecedented extent: administered to billions of people. As of 2022, all approved gene therapies were viral vector-based and over 1000 viral vector clinical trials targeting cancer were underway.

== In popular culture ==
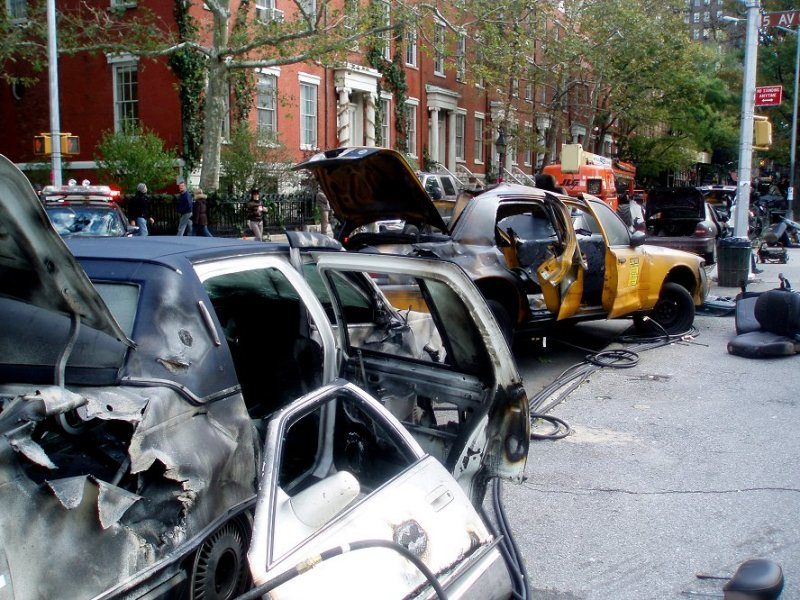
The film I Am Legend (set pictured) depicts a viral vector-created apocalypse.

In film, viral vectors are often portrayed as unintentionally causing a pandemic and civilizational catastrophe. The 2007 film I Am Legend depicts a cancer-targeting viral vector as unleashing a zombie apocalypse. Similarly, a viral vector therapy for Alzheimer's disease in Rise of the Planet of the Apes (2011) becomes a deadly pathogen and causes an ape uprising. Other films featuring viral vectors include The Bourne Legacy (2012) and Resident Evil: The Final Chapter (2016). An advanced form of viral vector vaccine is a critical story element in Jurassic World Dominion (2022), in which it is used to cure a character's genetic disorder and later to stop a man-made ecological crisis.

== Notes and references ==
=== Works cited ===
==== Journal articles ====
- Abrahamian P, Hammond RW, Hammond J (2020). "Plant Virus–Derived Vectors: Applications in Agricultural and Medical Biotechnology". Annual Review of Virology. 7 (1): 513–535. doi:10.1146/annurev-virology-010720-054958. PMID 32520661.
- Abril AG, Carrera M, Notario V, Sanchez-Perez A, Villa TG (2022). "The Use of Bacteriophages in Biotechnology and Recent Insights into Proteomics". Antibiotics. 11 (5): 653. doi:10.3390/antibiotics11050653. PMC 9137636. PMID 35625297.
- Barth ZK, Aylward FO (2024). "March of the proviruses". Proceedings of the National Academy of Sciences of the United States of America. 121 (14) e2402541121. Bibcode:2024PNAS..12102541B. doi:10.1073/pnas.2402541121. PMC 10998573. PMID 38527209.
- Bezeljak U (2022). "Cancer gene therapy goes viral: viral vector platforms come of age". Radiology and Oncology. 56 (1): 1–13. doi:10.2478/raon-2022-0002. PMC 8884858. PMID 35148469.
- Bulcha JT, Wang Y, Ma H, Tai PW, Gao G (2021). "Viral vector platforms within the gene therapy landscape". Signal Transduction and Targeted Therapy. 6 (1) 53. doi:10.1038/s41392-021-00487-6. PMC 7868676. PMID 33558455.
- Elkashif A, Alhashimi M, Sayedahmed EE, Sambhara S, Mittal SK (2021). "Adenoviral vector-based platforms for developing effective vaccines to combat respiratory viral infections". Clinical and Translational Immunology. 10 (10) e1345. doi:10.1002/cti2.1345. PMC 8510854. PMID 34667600.
- Elois MA, Silva R, Pilati GV, Rodriguez-Lazaro D, Fongaro G (2023). "Bacteriophages as Biotechnological Tools". Viruses. 15 (2): 268–284. doi:10.3390/v15020349. PMC 9963553. PMID 36851563.
- Ewer K, Sebastian S, Spencer AJ, Gilbert S, Hill AV, Lambe T (2017). "Chimpanzee adenoviral vectors as vaccines for outbreak pathogens". Human Vaccines & Immunotherapeutics. 13 (12): 3020–3032. doi:10.1080/21645515.2017.1383575. PMC 5718829. PMID 29083948.
- Farhad T, Neves K, Arbuthnot P, Maepa MB (2022). "Adenoviral Vectors: Potential as Anti-HBV Vaccines and Therapeutics". Genes. 13 (11): 1941. doi:10.3390/genes13111941. PMC 9689594. PMID 36360178.
- Feldman ZB, Clayton J (2022). "Genetics and Ethics in the "I am Legend" Corpus". Journal of Literature and Science. 14 (1–2): 94–107. doi:10.12929/jls.14.1-2.07. PMC 9764423. PMID 36545402.
- Glorioso JC, Cohen JB, Goins WF, Hall B, Jackson JW, Kohanbash G, et al. (2020). "Oncolytic HSV Vectors and Anti-Tumor Immunity". Current Issues in Molecular Biology. 41: 381–468. doi:10.21775/cimb.041.381. PMID 32938804.
- Gruntman AM, Flotte TR (2018). "The rapidly evolving state of gene therapy". The FASEB Journal. 32 (4): 1733–1740. doi:10.1096/fj.201700982R. PMID 31282760.
- Guo ZS, Lu B, Guo Z, Giehl E, Feist M, Dai E, et al. (2019). "Vaccinia virus-mediated cancer immunotherapy: cancer vaccines and oncolytics". Journal of Immunotherapy of Cancer. 9 (7) 6. doi:10.1186/s40425-018-0495-7. PMC 6325819. PMID 30626434.
- Haggerty CL, Grecco GG, Reeves KC, Atwood B (2019). "Adeno-Associated Viral Vectors in Neuroscience Research". Molecular Therapy - Methods and Clinical Development. 17: 69–82. doi:10.1016/j.omtm.2019.11.012. PMC 6931098. PMID 31890742.
- Hromic-Jahjefendic A, Lundstrom K (2020). "Viral Vector-Based Melanoma Gene Therapy". Biomedicines. 8 (60): 60. doi:10.3390/biomedicines8030060. PMC 7148454. PMID 32187995.
- Jackson DA, Symons RH, Berg P (1972). "Biochemical method for inserting new genetic information into DNA of Simian Virus 40: circular SV40 DNA molecules containing lambda phage genes and the galactose operon of Escherichia coli". Proceedings of the National Academy of Sciences of the United States of America. 69 (10): 2904–2909. Bibcode:1972PNAS...69.2904J. doi:10.1073/pnas.69.10.2904. PMC 389671. PMID 4342968.
- Kaynarcalidan O, Mascaraque SM, Drexler I (2021). "Vaccinia Virus: From Crude Smallpox Vaccines to Elaborate Viral Vector Vaccine Design". Biomedicines. 9 (11): 1780. doi:10.3390/biomedicines9121780. PMC 8698642. PMID 34944596.
- Khushalani NI, Harrington KJ, Melcher A, Bommareddy PK, Zamarin D (2023). "Breaking the barriers in cancer care: The next generation of herpes simplex virus-based oncolytic immunotherapies for cancer treatment". Molecular Therapy Oncolytics. 31 100729. doi:10.1016/j.omto.2023.100729. PMC 10570124. PMID 37841530.
- Labbé RP, Vessillier S, Rafiq QA (2021). "Lentiviral Vectors for T Cell Engineering: Clinical Applications, Bioprocessing and Future Perspectives". Viruses. 13 (152): 1528. doi:10.3390/v13081528. PMC 8402758. PMID 34452392.
- Lanigan TM, Kopera HC, Saunders TL (2020). "Principles of Genetic Engineering". Genes. 11 (3): 603–618. doi:10.3390/genes11030291. PMC 7140808. PMID 32164255.
- Larocca C, Schlom J (2011). "Viral vector-based therapeutic cancer vaccines". The Cancer Journal. 17 (5): 359–371. doi:10.1097/PPO.0b013e3182325e63. PMC 3207353. PMID 21952287.
- Li C, Samulski RJ (2020). "Engineering adeno-associated virus vectors for gene therapy". Nature Reviews Genetics. 21 (4): 255–272. doi:10.1038/s41576-019-0205-4. PMID 32042148.
- Li X, Le Y, Zhang Z, Nian X, Liu B, Yang X (2023). "Viral Vector-Based Gene Therapy". International Journal of Molecular Sciences. 24 (9): 7736. doi:10.3390/ijms24097736. PMC 10177981. PMID 37175441.
- Lukiw WJ (2023). "Commentary: A tribute to Dr. Paul Berg (1926-2023) American biochemist, Nobel Laureate and discoverer of recombinant DNA technology, vaccine and genetic engineering". Frontiers in Cell and Developmental Biology. 11 1210530. doi:10.3389/fcell.2023.1210530. PMC 10233203. PMID 37274735.
- McCann N, O'Connor D, Lambe T, Pollard AJ (2022). "Viral vector vaccines". Current Opinion in Immunology. 77 102210. doi:10.1016/j.coi.2022.102210. PMC 9612401. PMID 35643023.
- Merten O, Schweizer M, Chahal P, Kamen AA (2014). "Manufacturing of viral vectors for gene therapy: part I. Upstream processing". Pharmaceutical Bioprocessing. 2 (2): 183–203. doi:10.4155/pbp.14.16.
- Milone MC, O'Doherty U (2018). "Clinical use of lentiviral vectors". Leukemia. 32 (7): 1529–1541. doi:10.1038/s41375-018-0106-0. PMC 6035154. PMID 29654266.
- Mody PH, Pathak S, Hanson LK, Spencer JV (2020). "Herpes Simplex Virus: A Versatile Tool for Insights Into Evolution, Gene Delivery, and Tumor Immunotherapy". Virology. 11 1178122X20913274. doi:10.1177/1178122X20913274. PMC 8142529. PMID 34093008.
- Moen I, Jevne C, Wang J, Kalland K, Chekenya M, Akslen LA, et al. (2012). "Gene expression in tumor cells and stroma in dsRed 4T1 tumors in eGFP-expressing mice with and without enhanced oxygenation". BMC Cancer. 12 (21) 21. doi:10.1186/1471-2407-12-21. PMC 3274430. PMID 22251838.
- Moss B (2013). "Reflections on the early development of poxvirus vectors". Vaccine. 31 (39): 4220–4222. doi:10.1016/j.vaccine.2013.03.042. PMC 3755097. PMID 23583893.
- Nemirov K, Bourgine M, Anna F, Wei Y, Charneau P, Majlessi L (2023). "Lentiviral Vectors as a Vaccine Platform against Infectious Diseases". Pharmaceutics. 15 (3): 846. doi:10.3390/pharmaceutics15030846. PMC 10053212. PMID 36986707.
- Nomaguchi M, Fujita M, Miyazaki Y, Adachi A (2012). "Viral Tropism". Frontiers in Microbiology. 3 (281): 281. doi:10.3389/fmicb.2012.00281. PMC 3411105. PMID 22876241.
- Pasin F, Menzel W, Daròs JA (2019). "Harnessed viruses in the age of metagenomics and synthetic biology: an update on infectious clone assembly and biotechnologies of plant viruses". Plant Biotechnology Journal. 17 (6): 1010–1026. Bibcode:2019PBioJ..17.1010P. doi:10.1111/pbi.13084. PMC 6523588. PMID 30677208.
- Pasin F, Uranga M, Charudattan R, Kwon CT (2024). "Engineering good viruses to improve crop performance". Nature Reviews Bioengineering. 2 (7): 532–534. doi:10.1038/s44222-024-00197-y. hdl:10261/394453.
- Petrov G, Dymova M, Richter V (2022). "Bacteriophage-Mediated Cancer Gene Therapy". International Journal of Molecular Sciences. 23 (22) 14245. doi:10.3390/ijms232214245. PMC 9697857. PMID 36430720.
- Pranjol ZI, Hajitou A (2015). "Bacteriophage-Mediated Cancer Gene Therapy". Viruses. 7 (1): 268–284. doi:10.3390/v7010268. PMC 4306838. PMID 25606974.
- Sakuma T, Barry MA, Ikeda Y (2012). "Lentiviral vectors: basic to translational". Biochemical Journal. 443 (3): 603–618. doi:10.1042/BJ20120146. PMID 22507128.
- Sasmita AO (2019). "Current viral-mediated gene transfer research for treatment of Alzheimer's disease". Biotechnology & Genetic Engineering Reviews. 35 (1): 26–45. doi:10.1080/02648725.2018.1523521. PMID 30317930.
- Sánchez-Angulo M (2023). "Microbial pathogens in the movies". FEMS Microbiology Letters. 370 fnad129. doi:10.1093/femsle/fnad129. PMC 10754150. PMID 38059853.
- Sasso E, D'Alise AM, Zambrano N, Scarselli E, Folgori A, Nicosia A (2020). "New viral vectors for infectious diseases and cancer". Seminars in Immunology. 50 101430. doi:10.1016/j.smim.2020.101430. PMID 33262065.
- Schaefer A, Robbins KE, Nzilambi EN, Louis ME, Quinn TC, Folks TM, et al. (2005). "Divergent HIV and Simian Immunodeficiency Virus Surveillance, Zaire". Emerging Infectious Diseases. 11 (9): 1446–1448. doi:10.3201/eid1109.050179. PMC 3310624. PMID 16229778.
- Sibbald B (2001). "Death but one unintended consequence of gene-therapy trial". CMAJ. 164 (11): 1612. PMC 81135. PMID 11402803.
- Sheridan C (2011). "Gene therapy finds its niche". Nature Biotechnology. 29 (2): 121–128. doi:10.1038/nbt.1769. PMID 21301435.
- Smith GL, Mackett M, Moss B (1983). "Infectious vaccinia virus recombinants that express hepatitis B virus surface antigen". Nature. 302 (5908): 490–495. Bibcode:1983Natur.302..490S. doi:10.1038/302490a0. PMID 6835382.
- Travieso T, Li J, Mahesh S, Mello JD, Blasi M (2022). "The use of viral vectors in vaccine development". npj Vaccines. 7 (1) 75. doi:10.1038/s41541-022-00503-y. PMC 9253346. PMID 35787629.
- Ura T, Okuda K, Shimada M (2014). "Developments in Viral Vector-Based Vaccines". Vaccines. 2 (3): 624–641. doi:10.3390/vaccines2030624. PMC 4494222. PMID 26344749.
- van der Loo J, Wright JF (2016). "Progress and challenges in viral vector manufacturing". Human Molecular Genetics. 25 (R1): R42-52. doi:10.1093/hmg/ddv451. PMC 4802372. PMID 26519140.
- Wang S, Liang B, Wang W, Li L, Feng N, Zhao Y, et al. (2023). "Viral vectored vaccines: design, development, preventive and therapeutic applications in human diseases". Signal Transduction and Targeted Therapy. 8 (1) 149. doi:10.1038/s41392-023-01408-5. PMC 10081433. PMID 37029123.
- Wirth T, Parker N, Ylä-Herttuala S (2013). "History of gene therapy". Gene. 525 (2): 162–169. doi:10.1016/j.gene.2013.03.137. PMID 23618815.
- Zaidi SS, Mansoor S (2017). "Viral Vectors for Plant Genome Engineering". Frontiers in Plant Science. 8: 539. Bibcode:2017FrPS....8..539Z. doi:10.3389/fpls.2017.00539. PMC 5386974. PMID 28443125.
- Zhang Z, Dong L, Zhao C, Zheng P, Zhang X, Xu J (2021). "Vaccinia virus-based vector against infectious diseases and tumors". Human Vaccines & Immunotherapeutics. 17 (6): 1578–1585. doi:10.1080/21645515.2020.1840887. PMC 8115763. PMID 33606578.

==== News articles ====
- "Fact check: A vaccine did not turn characters in the movie 'I Am Legend' into zombies". Reuters. December 18, 2020.
- Kolata G (27 November 2017). "Gene Therapy Hits a Peculiar Roadblock: A Virus Shortage". The New York Times. Archived from the original on 25 April 2023.
- Stolberg SG (28 November 1999). "The Biotech Death of Jesse Gelsinger". The New York Times Magazine. Archived from the original on 25 October 2012.

==== Books and protocols ====
- Carmen I (1985). Cloning and the Constitution: An Inquiry into Governmental Policymaking and Genetic Experimentation. University of Wisconsin Press. ISBN 978-0-299-10340-8.
- Kayser FH, Bienz KA, Eckert J, Zinkernagel RM (2005). Medical Microbiology (10 ed.). Thieme. ISBN 1-58890-245-5.
- Warnock JN, Daigre C, Al-Rubeai M (2011). "Introduction to Viral Vectors". In Manfredsson FP, Benskey MJ (eds.). Viral Vectors for Gene Therapy: Methods and Protocols. Springer. pp. 1–25. ISBN 978-1-4939-9064-1.
