= Unsuccessful transfer =

Failure of bacterial reproduction

Regular genetic transformation: A gene from bacterial cell 1 is moved to bacterial cell 2.

Unsuccessful transfer or abortive transfer is any bacterial DNA transfer from donor cells to recipient cells that fails to be replicated during cell division. (In other words, the incoming DNA does not become inherited.) This may be due to:

- Failure of the incoming DNA to form a circular molecule or to integrate into one;
- Loss of a maintenance system (see plasmid partition system).

As a result of the abortive transfer, among all daughter cells of the recipient cell, only one cell will be holding the transferred DNA. Genes that are located on an abortively transferred piece of DNA can still express in the recipient cell.

Abortive transfer can happen after transduction, transformation, or conjugation -- all of the three main types of genetic exchange in bacteria. Abortive transduction is especially frequent.

== Dictionary definition ==
Rieger, Michaelis, and Green, in 1976 stated:

"'abortive transfer – any DNA transfer from bacterial donor to recipients cells that fails to establish the incoming DNA as part of the hereditary material of the recipient. A. t. has been observed following → transduction → transformation, and → conjugation. In all cases, the transmitted fragment is diluted out as the culture grows. Failure of integration of transferred DNA into the hereditary material of the recipient cell may be due to: 1. The failure of incoming DNA to form circular molecules; 2. circularization takes place, but the circular molecule fails to take up maintenance system. A. t. of the extrachromosomal elements (→ plasmids) as opposed to chromosomal fragments, is relatively uncommon elements since plasmids are genetic elements of autonomous survival in a bacterial cell. It is only when a mutation in the recipient or a resident plasmid makes the host component of the plasmid maintenance system inactive that a. t. of a plasmid occurs. Genes carried on abortive pieces of DNA may be expressed in the recipient cells.

== See also ==
- Gene expression
- Plasmid
- Transduction
