= Restriction enzyme mediated integration =

Restriction enzyme mediated integration (abbreviated as REMI) is a technique for integrating DNA (linearised plasmid) into the genome sites that have been generated by the same restriction enzyme used for the DNA linearisation. The plasmid integration occurs at the corresponding sites in the genome, often by regenerating the recognition sites by same the restriction enzyme used for plasmid linearisation.

== Mechanism ==
The specific restriction enzyme cleaves the genomic DNA at random points, and generates recognition sites. The DNA fragment to be inserted is linearised using the said same restriction enzyme and the mix injected into the cell followed by a successful insertion of a DNA fragment.

== Applications ==
The REMI method has been used to generate genetically modified organisms including the Saccharomyces cerevisiae, Dictyostelium discoideum and Xenopus laevis.

=== Genome engineering ===
REMI has been used for large-scale transgenesis in X. laevis embryos in order to study various signaling pathways including the FGF and the Thyroid system.
