= Carmovirus =

Defunct genus of viruses

Carmovirus was a genus of viruses. The genus was split in 2015 into three genera, each retaining -carmovirus as part of their name:

- Alphacarmovirus
- Betacarmovirus
- Gammacarmovirus

These genera are in the same family, Tombusviridae, as the original genus and are more specifically in the subfamily Procedovirinae. The following species were assigned to Carmovirus and are, as of 2020, placed within Procedovirinae but not assigned to a genus:

- Ahlum waterborne virus
- Bean mild mosaic virus
- Cucumber soil-borne virus
- Weddel waterborne virus
