= Achiasmate meiosis =

Type of cell division

Achiasmate meiosis refers to meiosis without chiasmata, which are structures that are necessary for recombination to occur and that usually aid in the segregation of non-sister homologs. The pachytene stage of prophase I typically results in the formation of chiasmata between homologous non-sister chromatids in the tetrad chromosomes that form. The formation of a chiasma is also referred to as crossing over. When two homologous chromatids cross over, they form a chiasma at the point of their intersection. However, it has been found that there are cases where one or more pairs of homologous chromosomes do not form chiasmata during pachynema. Without a chiasma, no recombination between homologs can occur.

The traditional line of thinking was that without at least one chiasma between homologs, they could not be properly segregated during metaphase because there would be no tension between the homologs for the microtubules to pull against. This tension between the homologs is typically what allows the chromosomes to align along an axis of the cell (the metaphase plate) and to then properly segregate to opposite sides of the cell. Despite this, achiasmate homologs are still found to line up with the chiasmate chromosomes at the metaphase plate.

== Chromosomal segregation strategies ==
Chiasmata play a crucial role in correctly segregating the chromosomes during meiosis I to maintain correct ploidy; when chiasmata fail to form, it typically results in aneuploidy and nonviable gametes. However, some species have been found to employ alternative methods to segregate chromosomes. They all involve linking the homologs together with some structure. These structures provide the same needed tension that chiasmata usually provide.

=== Synaptonemal complex and centromere interaction ===
One segregation strategy is to create a centromere-centromere interaction between achiasmate homologous chromosomes. Residual proteins from the synaptonemal complex (SC) 'stick' between the homologs' centromeres after diplotene, when the SC typically dissociates, allowing the homologs to achieve biorientation and attach correctly to the microtubules during anaphase I. This has been observed in budding yeast, Drosophila melanogaster, and mouse spermatocytes.

=== Heterochromatin ===
Heterochromatin is a tightly grouped type of DNA. Threads of heterochromatin have been observed in Drosophila melanogaster, connecting achiasmate homologs and allowing them to move pull back and forth by spindles as a connected duo.

== Known achiasmatic species ==
=== Saccharomycodes ludwigii ===
While multiple species of budding yeast have been found to have residual SC proteins that connect the centromeres together when needed, nearly all of said species are chiasmatic and have been simply used as convenient model organisms. However, Saccharomycodes ludwigii also displays centromere-centromere interactions with SC proteins and is also almost entirely achiasmatic. It employs the breeding strategy of automixis (commonly used by many budding yeasts) in addition with a nearly complete lack of genetic mixing via crossovers to gain the genetic/evolutionary advantages of cloning (asexual reproduction) while maintaining the heterozygosity typically afforded by sexual reproduction. S. ludwigii also creates strong connections between the tetrads produced by meiosis to promote the breeding (automixis) within the tetrad. This breeding strategy may have evolved "through mutual selection between suppression of meiotic recombination and frequent intratetrad mating", which would have helped the trait spread to fixation.

=== Drosophila melanogaster ===
In Drosophila melanogaster, both oocytes and spermatocytes display achiasmy. In oocytes, neither the 4th nor the sex-determining chromosomes form chiasmata; in spermatocytes, no chiasmata form on any of the chromosomes. Heterochromatin threads have been observed in D. melanogaster oocytes. Unusually, D. melanogaster lack SCs all together, so SC proteins likely do not play a role in this species' segregation strategy.

=== Amazon Molly ===
Amazon Mollies (Poecilia formosa) reproduce without recombination via gynogenesis. They mate with males of other species and the sperm triggers the development of their eggs, but the Amazon Mollies create diploid eggs that have copies of only their own genes. There is no crossing over during their meiosis, indicating that they have achiasmate meiosis. It is theorized that this failure during the meiotic cycle is what creates the diploid eggs and that likely sister chromatids are separated during meiosis instead of the homologs in this species. If sister chromatids are being separated instead of homologs, than proper segregation of homologs has failed in this species.

=== Insects ===
True bugs (order Heteroptera) are partially of achiasmate species and partially of chiasmate species in reference to spermatogenesis. The infraorder Cimicomorpha, specifically its families Anthocoridae, Microphysidae, Cimicidae, Miridae, and Nabidae are achiasmate. Additionally, achiasmy has been reported in the infraorder Leptopodomorpha and in the family Micronectidae on the infraorder Nepomorpha. A deeper understanding of how meiosis proceeds in these achiasmate species is still under investigation.

== Evolution ==
It is thought that achiasmatic meiosis is polyphyletic, as there is no distinct pattern to its occurrence, nor to the methods through which it occurs. It appears to instead be multiple instances of secondary loss of meiotic recombination that resulted in either the evolution of new segregation processes, or a shift to an existing backup system for segregation. Current evidence suggests the latter, that there are existing mechanisms to segregate homologs without chiasmata, as these mechanisms (heterochromatin and centromere-centromere interaction) have been observed in chiasmate species.
