= Four-gamete test =

In population genetics, the four-gamete test (FGT) is a method for detecting historical recombination events.

== Description ==
The four gamete-test detects pairs of segregating sites that have arisen either by recombination or by a repeat mutation. The test is based on an infinite-sites assumption (i.e. repeat mutations have zero probability). Under this hypothesis, the probability of a repeat mutation is zero, and hence a recombination event is inferred. For example, if the data being studied consists of bi-allelic single-nucleotide polymorphism data, then the following configuration could be generated without recombination. Indeed, for instance, from genotype 0, 0, one mutation can give rise to genotype 0, 1, and another mutation can give rise to genotype 1, 0.

| Chromosome | Site 1 | Site 2 |
|---|---|---|
| 1 | 0 | 0 |
| 2 | 1 | 0 |
| 3 | 0 | 1 |

However, the following configuration cannot be generated without recombination. Indeed, the assumption of the infinite site model supposes that mutation at site 1 in genotype 2 to produce genotype 4 is impossible (and so is mutation at site 2 in genotype 3).

| Chromosome | Site 1 | Site 2 |
|---|---|---|
| 1 | 0 | 0 |
| 2 | 1 | 0 |
| 3 | 0 | 1 |
| 4 | 1 | 1 |

Hence, in this example, the existence of genotype 4 is the hallmark of recombination. The FGT detects recombination events by identifying the type of configuration presented above in the data. FGT can be performed using R.

The FGT has low statistical power to detect recombination. Furthermore, the FGT is suitable only when the mutation rate is significantly smaller than the recombination rate. If the mutation rate is high, then the infinite-sites assumption is violated. For example, the FGT is generally suitable for human datasets, but is unsuitable for bacterial datasets.

== See also ==
- Genetic recombination
- Coalescent theory
