= Intracellular delivery =

Scientific research area

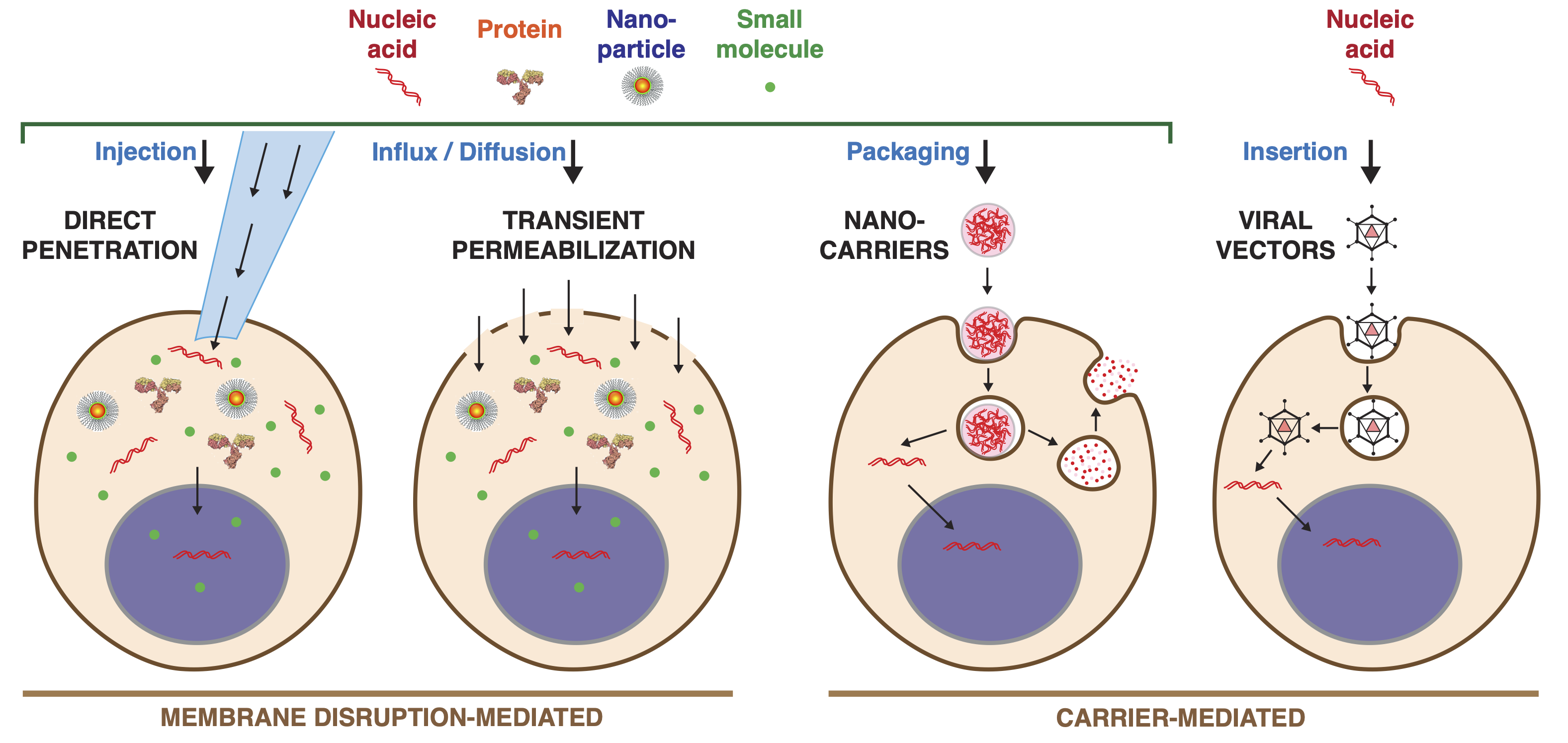
Intracellular delivery through viral vectors, non-viral carriers, and membrane disruption. Membrane disruption-mediated delivery can introduce diverse materials by direct penetration or permeabilisation mechanisms. Viral vectors are capable of DNA or RNA delivery through engineering. Non-viral nano-carriers have mostly been used for nucleic acid delivery but can also be designed for delivery of more diverse materials. Most nano-carriers enter the cell via endocytosis and a significant portion of endocytosed material is broken down within the cell and/or recycled to the cell exterior.

Intracellular delivery is the process of introducing external materials into living cells. Materials that are delivered into cells include nucleic acids (DNA and RNA), proteins, peptides, impermeable small molecules, synthetic nanomaterials, organelles, and micron-scale tracers, devices and objects. Such molecules and materials can be used to investigate cellular behavior, engineer cell operations or correct a pathological function.

Medical applications of intracellular delivery range from in vitro fertilisation (IVF) and mRNA vaccines to gene therapy and preparation of CAR-T cells. Industrial applications include protein production, biomanufacture, and genetic engineering of plants and animals. Intracellular delivery is a fundamental technique in the study of biology and genetics, such as the use of DNA plasmid transfection to investigate protein function in living cells. A wide range of approaches exist for performing intracellular delivery including biological, chemical and physical techniques that work through either membrane disruption or packaging the delivery material in carriers.

Intracellular delivery is at the intersection of cell biology and technology, and is related to many fields across science and medicine including genetics, biotechnology, bioengineering and drug delivery.

== Applications ==
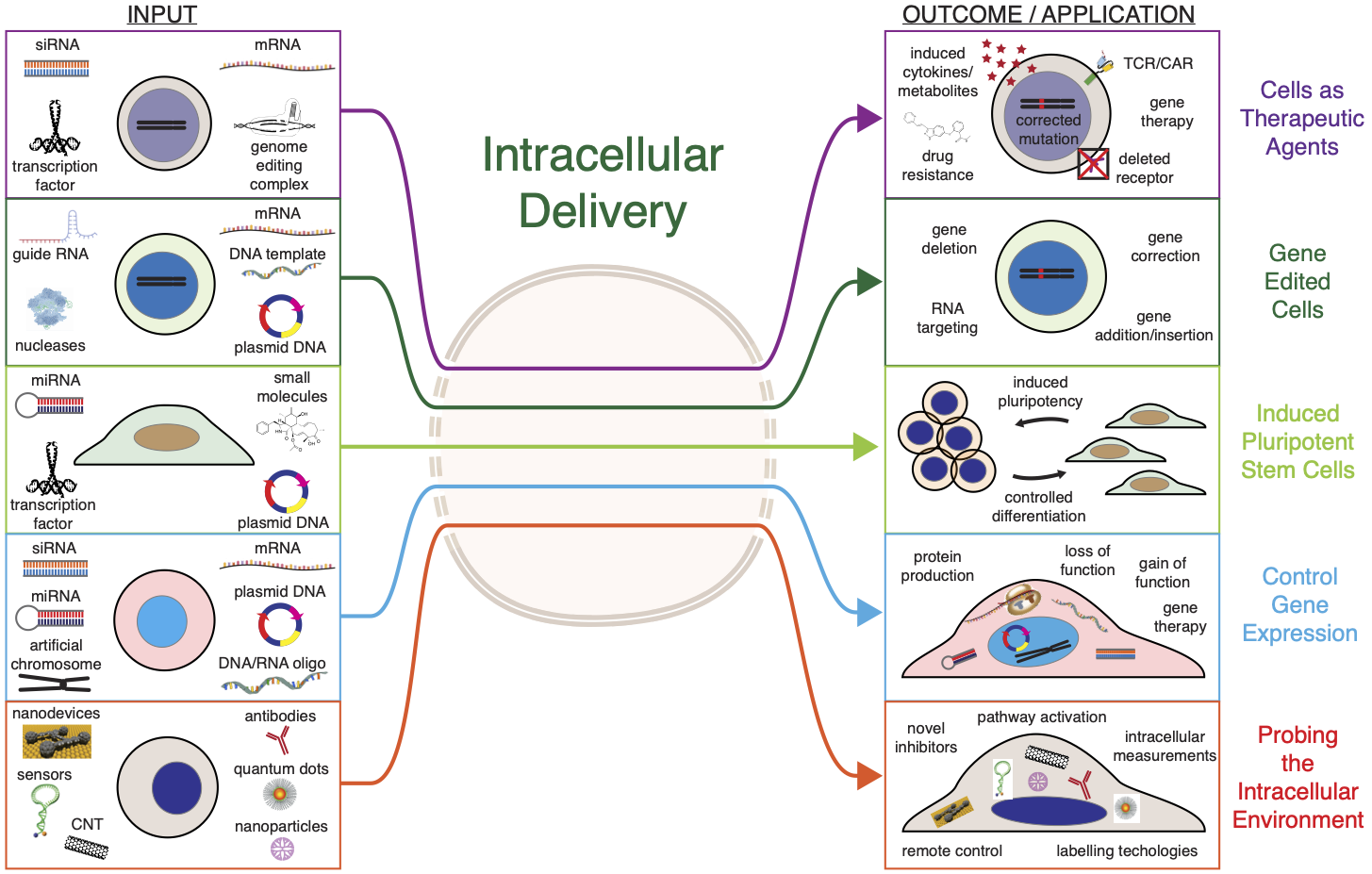
Applications of Intracellular Delivery. Depending on the input materials delivered into cells, different outcomes or applications can be achieved. TCR = T cell receptor, CAR = chimeric antigen receptor, HSCs = hematopoietic stem cells, CNT = carbon nanotube

Analogous to the way computers operate through electronic signals, cells process and transmit information through molecules. Depending on the molecules and materials that are loaded into cells, different outcomes or applications can be achieved (see Figure "Applications of Intracellular Delivery" for examples). Below are some of the main classifications of cargo materials used to investigate and engineer cells through intracellular delivery.

=== Cargo types ===
==== Nucleic acids ====
Transfection refers to the intracellular delivery of nucleic acids: DNA, RNA and their analogues. Nucleic acid materials that are commonly transfected into cells are plasmid DNA, mRNA, siRNA, and oligonucleotides. The transfection applications span across 3 main areas:

1. Basic biological research,
2. biomanufacture, and
3. gene and cell-based therapies

In basic research, transfection is a cornerstone technique in fields ranging from cell biology and genetics to immunology and drug discovery. In biomanufacture, transfection is used for production of proteins, antibodies, viral vectors, and virus-like particles for vaccines. In cell-based therapies transfection is used for applications such as ex-vivo gene therapy, hematopoietic stem cell engineering, production of induced pluripotent stem cells, and ex-vivo preparation of cells for immunotherapy. Over the last 50 years nucleic acid transfection has been the most common subcategory of intracellular delivery.

Plasmid DNA began to be transfected into animal cells for the purpose of gene expression in the late 1970s via microinjection and calcium phosphate methods. Since then, it has been used to investigate gene and protein function in manifold studies. DNA plasmids are physically large and cumbersome molecules with a 5-10 kilo-basepair plasmid being >100 nm diameter in solution when free and uncondensed. Nevertheless, due to the well-established and relatively low-cost techniques for editing and preparing them, they have been very commonly used in biological research.

In the 1970s it was shown that microinjection of mRNA resulted in protein expression. In certain situations, mRNA transfection is considered advantageous for inducing protein expression compared with DNA plasmids due to the following reasons:

1. reduced risk of genomic integration,
2. does not require nuclear delivery with cytosolic delivery being sufficient,
3. protein expression is dose-dependent and rapid,
4. less toxic and immunogenic than DNA vectors when appropriately chemically modified.

Thus, mRNA is considered a better option than DNA for most therapeutic applications although it is more expensive and intrinsically unstable.

Oligonucleotides are single or double-stranded sequences of DNA or RNA of less than 30 nucleotides in length. Small interfering RNA (siRNAs) are short 21-22 base pair duplexes of RNA that can be transfected into cells to silence gene expression . Since their Nobel prize winning discovery in 1998, siRNA have been transfected into cells in thousands of biological studies in order to perturb gene function. Other oligonucleotides of interest for intracellular delivery include antisense oligonucleotides (ASOs), micro RNAs (miRNAs), and aptamers. Such oligonucleotides can be used to alter cell behaviour through several different mechanisms.

Lipid nanoparticles and electroporation are currently widespread strategies for nucleic acid transfection. However, effective transfection remains a hurdle in many primary cells, stem cells, patient-derived cells and neurons. The ability to conduct biological research and carry out potential medical applications in such cells is often limited by transfection efficiency and tolerance to treatment. Furthermore, there is currently a poor understanding of the long-term effects of performing transfection on cells within the human body.

==== Proteins and peptides ====
Delivery of proteins into living cells, such as genome-editing nucleases, active inhibitory antibodies, or stimulatory transcription factors, represents a versatile toolset for altering and analyzing cell function. Furthermore, effective intracellular delivery could expand the repertoire of usable protein drugs as most current protein-based therapeutics identify extracellular targets and this is a frontier of current research efforts.

Delivery of purified proteins into cells began as early as the 1960s. Examples include amoeba microinjected with ferritin and mouse eggs microinjected with bovine albumin. Because proteins have diverse size, shape and charge, they cannot easily be delivered into cells with one-size-fits-all solutions that cationic lipids use for nucleic acid transfection. In contrast, a diverse range of methods have been used to deliver proteins into cells including: microinjection, osmotic lysis of pinosomes, hypotonic shock, scrape loading, bead loading, syringe loading, detergent exposure, electroporation, pore-forming toxins, cell penetrating peptides, nanocarriers, cell squeezing, nanoneedles, acoustic perturbations, and vapor nanobubbles. For the purposes of genome editing, Cas9 protein combined with sgRNA has been delivered by methods ranging from electroporation, microinjection, lipid nanoparticle formulations, osmotically induced endocytosis followed by endosome disruption, microfluidic deformation, and cell penetrating peptides among others.

==== Small molecules ====
Small molecules requiring intracellular delivery include:

1. impermeable small molecule drugs,
2. small molecule probes, and
3. cryoprotectants.

An example of the former is bleomycin, an anticancer drug with poor permeability due to its positive charge and hydrophobicity. By performing intracellular delivery with electroporation, bleomycin potency can be increased more than a hundred-fold. As for small molecule probes, when delivered to the cell interior, these molecules are capable of reporting cellular properties such as membrane potential, pH, and concentrations of ions. One example is PFBI, a fluorescent dye that can be employed for measurement of intracellular potassium concentration. Finally, some candidate cryoprotectant molecules such as impermeable sugars are highly hydrophilic and do not ready diffuse across cell membranes. For example, trehalose (Mw = 342 Da) is a natural disaccharide synthesized by a range of organisms to help them withstand desiccation or freezing. Trehalose loaded into animal cells at concentrations up to 200 mM has been shown to provide excellent cryoprotection during freezing and thawing.

==== Microscale cargo ====
Cargo materials in the microscale have been successfully delivered into cells for a variety of applications. For a century microinjection has been the dominant method for introducing microscale cargo into cells. A classic example was the transplant of a somatic cell nucleus into a frog egg to demonstrate that nuclei from fully differentiated somatic cells could grow into a new animal when inserted into an egg. Microinjection was first used to inject sperm into eggs as a proof of concept for IVF in animals. Artificial chromosomes have been engineered and transferred into cells by microinjection for proof-of-concept gene therapy. Transplant of mitochondria has also been demonstrated in several cell types via microinjection. More recently laser-triggered cavitation bubbles have been used to open transient holes in the cell membrane for the purpose of delivering bacteria and mitochondria. Using microinjection or ballistic propulsion, micron-scale particles, spheres, and beads have been loaded into cells for cellular microrheology studies that assess internal mechanical behavior of cells. For example, using microinjected PEGylated tracer beads of up to 5.6 micron, it was shown that motor-driven cytoplasmic mixing substantially enhanced intracellular movement of both small and large cellular components. In 2024, an AFM-based microinjection platform, Fluid-FM, was used to implant bacteria into fungi and study the emergence of symbiotic relationships between host fungi and bacteria.

==== Others ====
Other materials of interest for intracellular delivery include carbon nanotubes, quantum dots, magnetic nanoparticles, and nanodevices that serve as sensors or probes.

Properties of common molecules of interest for intracellular delivery
Material	Size (units)	Approx. mass (Da)	Dimensions in solution (nm)	Charge at neutral pH
Small molecules	N/A	< 900 Da	<1 nm	variable; often neutral to promote permeability
Peptides	<40 amino acids	~110 Da per amino acid	0.2 - 3 nm	variable according to amino acid composition
Proteins	20 - 1000s of amino acids	~110 Da per amino acid	~2 - 25 nm	variable according to amino acid composition
Cas9 ribonucleoprotein (RNP)	~1400 amino acids + 100 bases RNA	~188 kDa (~158 kDa protein + ~30 kDa RNA)	~12 - 15 nm	~ −80 (+22 protein, −100 sgRNA)
Antisense Oligonucleotide (ASO)	13 - 25 bases (single stranded)	4 - 8 kDa	length: 4 - 8 nm if linear	-1 per base
siRNA / miRNA	21 - 23 base pairs	13 - 15 kDa	2 nm wide x 7.5 nm long	-1 per base
mRNA	0.5 - 10 kilo-bases RNA (single-stranded)	~320 Da per base	tens to hundreds of nm	-1 per base
plasmid DNA	0.5 - 10 kilo-basepairs DNA (double-stranded)	~650 Da per base	hundreds of nm; depends on supercoiling	-1 per base

=== Medical Applications ===
The following are examples of medical treatments that rely on intracellular delivery in at least one step.

Hematopoietic stem cell-based gene therapies:

- Strimvelis for the treatment of adenosine deaminase severe combined immunodeficiency (ADA-SCID), produced through ex vivo gamma retroviral vector gene delivery of a functional adenosine deaminase (ADA) gene (European approval granted 2017). Strimvelis was the first ex vivo autologous gene therapy to gain approval from the European Medicines Agency.
- Atidarsagene autotemcel (branded as Libmeldy) for the treatment of metachromatic leukodystrophy (MLD), produced through ex vivo lentiviral gene delivery of a functional human arylsulfatase A (ARSA) gene (European approval granted 2020).
- Betibeglogene autotemcel (branded as Zynteglo) for the treatment of transfusion-dependent beta thalassemia (TDT), produced through ex vivo lentiviral gene delivery of a functional human HBB gene (European and US approvals granted 2022).

CAR-T cell immunotherapies:

- Tisagenlecleucel (branded as Kymriah) for the treatment of B-cell acute lymphoblastic leukemia (B-Cell ALL), produced through ex vivo lentiviral gene delivery of a CAR gene targeting CD-19 (US approval granted 2017).
- Axicabtagene Ciloleucel (branded as Yescarta) for the treatment of large B-cell lymphoma, produced through ex vivo gamma retroviral gene delivery of a CAR gene targeting CD-19 (US approval granted 2017).
- Brexucabtagene Autoleucel (branded as Tecartus) for the treatment of adult patients with relapsed/refractory mantle cell lymphoma (r/r MCL), produced through ex vivo gamma retroviral gene delivery of a CAR gene targeting CD-19 (US approval granted 2021).

In vivo viral vector-mediated gene therapy:

- Onasemnogene Abeparvovec (branded as Zolgesma) for the treatment of spinal muscular atrophy, administered by intravenous infusion of a AAV9 viral vector that delivers a functional SMN1 transgene to the affected motor neurons (US approval granted 2019).
- Voretigene neparvovec (branded as Luxturna) for the treatment of Leber congenital amaurosis (an inherited retinal disorder causing progressive blindness), administered by subretinal injection of a AAV2 viral vector that delivers a functional copy of the RPE65 gene to eye cells to compensate for the RPE65 mutation (US approval granted 2017).

siRNA medicines:

- Patisiran (Onpattro) for the treatment of polyneuropathy in people with hereditary transthyretin-mediated amyloidosis, administered by intravenous infusion of siRNA formulated into lipid nanoparticles that gain entry into liver cells to silence the expression of pathogenic transthyretin mRNA (US and European approval granted 2018).
- Givosiran (Givlaari) for the treatment of adults with acute hepatic porphyria, administered by administered by intravenous infusion of siRNA-GalNAc conjugates that gain entry into liver hepatocytes to silence the expression of pathogenic aminolevulinate synthase 1 (ALAS1) mRNA (US approval granted 2019).

mRNA vaccines:

- Moderna COVID-19 Vaccine (branded as Spikevax) designed to provide protection against COVID-19 caused by infection with the SARS-CoV-2 virus (US emergency use authorization 2020). It is administered by intramuscular injection of 0.5 mL doses of mRNA-LNP complexes in saline. Local injection has been reported to deliver mRNA-LNP complexes to resident/infiltrating APCs, related immune cells, and muscle cells, stimulating local expression of covid spike protein to prime the immune system against future exposure to SARS-CoV-2.
- Pfizer-BioNTech COVID-19 Vaccine (branded as Comirnaty) designed to provide protection against COVID-19 caused by infection with the SARS-CoV-2 virus (US emergency use authorization 2020). The mechanism is the same as Moderna (above) except that composition of the lipid nanoparticles are different, with Pfizer using the ionizable lipid known as ALC-0315 while Moderna uses an ionizable lipid called SM-102.

Antisense oligonucleotides (ASOs):

- Mipomersen (branded as Kynamro), for the treatment of homozygous familial hypercholesterolaemia, administered by subcutaneous injection of chemically modified ASOs that accumulate into the liver with a half-life of ~30 days. The ASOs gain entry into liver cells to prevent the expression of pathogenic ApoB mRNA (US approval granted 2013).
- Spinraza (branded as Nusinersen) for the treatment of Spinal Muscular Atrophy (SMA), administered by intrathecal injection of chemically modified ASOs that enter motor neuron cells, bind SMN2 mRNA, and alter the alternative splicing of the SMN2 gene to restore expression of the protein.

In vitro fertilisation (IVF) for human pregnancies:

- In cases such as low sperm count or motility, or where eggs cannot easily be penetrated by sperm, single sperm may be microinjected directly into the egg using a procedure termed intracytoplasmic sperm injection (ICSI). After injection the fertilised egg is incubated in a special growth medium for about 48 hours until the egg consists of six to eight cells. It is then transferred to the patient's uterus through a thin, plastic catheter, which goes through the vagina and cervix. The first human pregnancy generated by ICSI was carried out in 1991 by Gianpiero Palermo and his team. IVF through ICSI has facilitated millions of pregnancies worldwide since the 1990s.

Safety. Research is still in the early stages of understanding the immediate and long-term medical effects of intracellular delivery of materials to human cells. For example, investigations have shown that children born through ICSI suffer more health problems than those naturally conceived. However, it is not known whether this is due to poorer health of the parents reproductive systems or aspects of the IVF and ICSI procedure. HSC-based gene therapies prepared with gamma retroviral and lentiviral vectors have in some cases shown an increased risk of leukemia down the track due to genotoxicity, as occurred with Strimvelis. Furthermore, the lipids used for intracellular delivery of therapeutic siRNA and mRNA may cause inflammatory reactions. In the case of patisiran, pretreatment with multiple anti-inflammatory drugs is used to minimize reactions to the nanoparticle. There is currently little data available on the medical impact of intracellular delivery of novel chemical components of mRNA vaccines, such as SM-102 and ALC-0315, on both the short and long-term health of the recipient population. Thus, safety and unintended side-effects will continue to be a topic of importance for medical treatments that utilize intracellular delivery.

One high profile example of a patient dying after a medical intervention involving intracellular delivery for gene therapy was the case of Jesse Gelsinger, who was injected with an adenoviral vector containing a corrected form of the disease gene associated with ornithine transcarbamylase deficiency. He died 4 days after treatment on September 17, 1999 and this tragedy generated much caution for the use of viral vectors in gene therapy treatments. In 2026 it was reported that several children had died in gene therapy clinical trials in China.

== Categories of methods ==
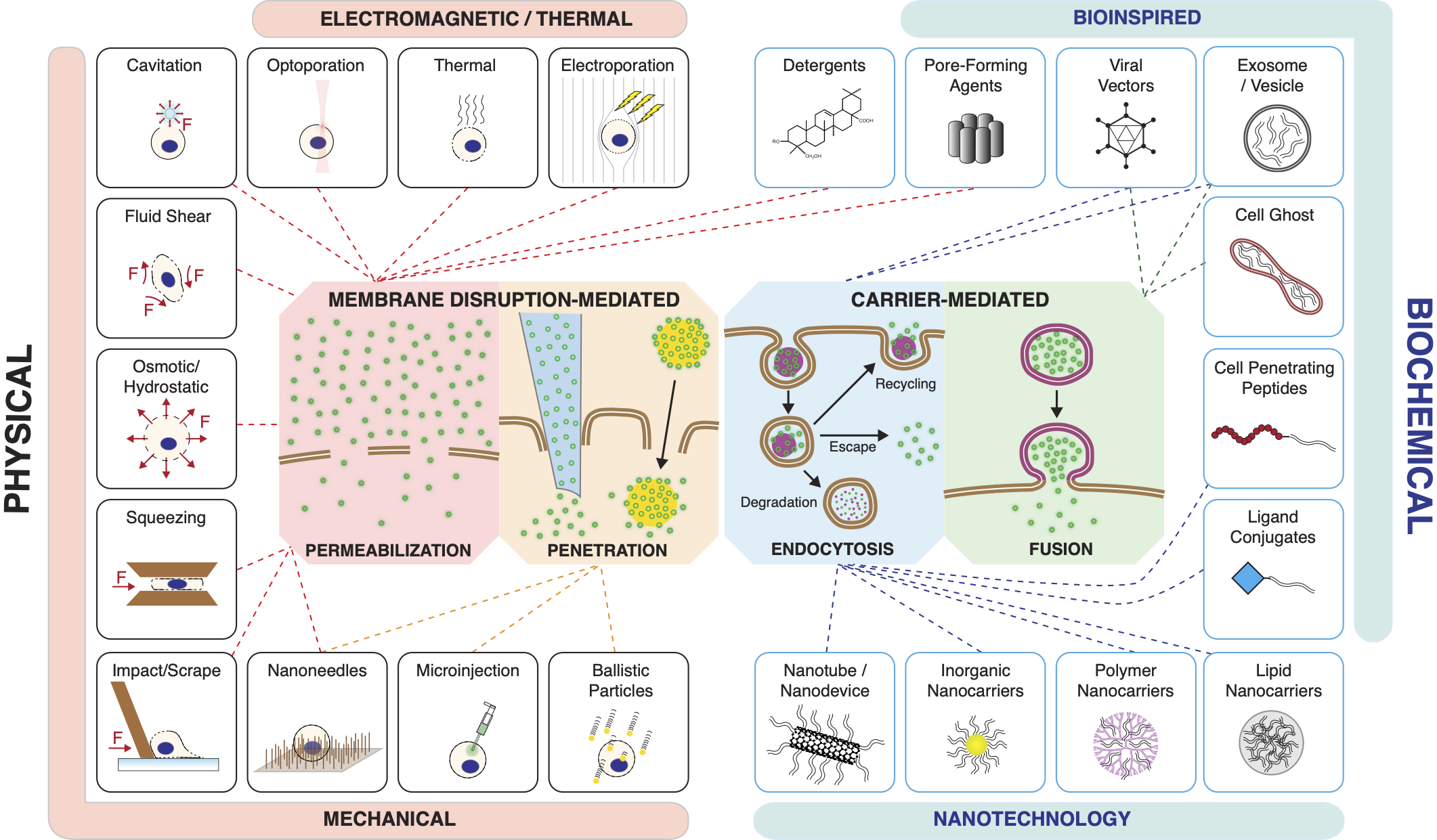
Methods of intracellular delivery mapped to mechanism. Methods are linked to their mechanism of action, being 1) permeabilization, 2) direct penetration, 3) endocytosis, or 4) fusion . Some method categories can operate through multiple mechanisms (e.g. certain pore-forming toxins induce endocytosis and subsequent endosome disruption while others transiently permeabilize the plasma membrane). Most of the physical methods are membrane disrupting while most of the biochemical methods are carrier-mediated.

Current methods of intracellular delivery can be placed into two broad categories:

1. Membrane disruption-mediated
2. Carrier-mediated

=== Membrane disruption ===
Membrane disruption-mediated techniques involve creating temporary holes in the cell membrane and delivering the cargo molecules via either
A) Permeabilization and diffusive influx of materials from the extracellular solution
B) Direct penetration with a vehicle or carrier that both punctures the plasma membrane and introduces the cargo of interest.
The plasma membrane of the cell can be disrupted through mechanical, electrical, chemical, optical or thermal means.

Intracellular delivery methods that employ permeabilization include:

- Electroporation
- Thermal treatments
- Optoporation (usually with a laser)
- Cavitation effects (usually from ultrasound or laser/particle interactions)
- Fluid shear (usually via microfluidics or cavitation)
- Detergents/Surfactants
- Pore-forming toxins
- Osmotic/Hydrostatic forces
- Direct mechanical methods like microfluidic cell squeezing, scrape loading, bead loading.

Intracellular delivery methods that utilize direct penetration include:

- Classic microinjection
- Advanced microinjection (e.g. Automation, Nanopipette, Nanopipette combined with scanning ion conductance, AFM combined with microinjection)
- Ballistic particles / Gene gun
- Nanoneedles and their variations such as Nanostraws, Nanospears and Nanowires.

Membrane disruption-mediated delivery methods can deliver almost any material that can be dispersed in solution, making them more universal than carrier-mediated methods. The major challenge for membrane disruption-mediated methods is to create holes of the optimal shape, size, location, and duration for the required delivery application. Excessive membrane damage and loss of cell contents should be avoided as it can kill cells or impair their function.

=== Carriers ===
Carrier-mediated delivery techniques package the cargo into or onto a nanoscale carrier, which then enters the cell to deliver the cargo. Carriers generally gain entry to the cell interior via either

1. Endocytosis (the majority of carriers) or
2. Fusion with the cell's plasma membrane

However, there are rare reports of certain carriers crossing or transiently disrupting the plasma membrane through hitherto unknown mechanisms .

Carrier-based approaches comprise various biochemical assemblies, mostly of molecular to nanoscale dimensions. The purpose of these carriers are generally:

1. to package the cargo and protect it from degradation,
2. to gain access to the intended intracellular compartment, and
3. to release the payload at the appropriate time and location.

Carriers can be bio-inspired, such as reconstituted viruses, virus like particles, vesicles, cell ghosts, and functional ligands and peptides. They may be based upon synthesis techniques from chemistry, materials science and nanotechnology, involving assembly of macromolecular complexes from organic and inorganic origins. Carriers that have been used for intracellular delivery include:

- Polymer assemblies
- Lipid assemblies
- Liposomes (hollow with aqueous interior, unlike lipid assemblies)
- Salt complexes (e.g. CaPO_{4}-nucleic acid condensates)
- Exosomes and other bio-inspired vesicles
- Cell-penetrating peptides (CPPs), also known as protein transduction domains (PTDs)
- Ligand conjugates
- Protein or sugar based nanoassemblies (e.g. Chitosan)
- Inorganic nanocarriers (e.g. mesoporous silica, metal nanoparticles, magnetic nanoparticles)
- Nanotechnology-based carriers (e.g. quantum dots, carbon nanotubes)
- Viral vectors (based on lentivirus, retrovirus, adenovirus, adeno-associated virus(AAV), and other viruses)
- Re-purposed bacterial toxins and viral components

Research into how carriers enter cells indicates that most enter via endocytosis before escaping from endosomal compartments into the cytoplasm . Mechanisms of endocytosis available to nanocarriers include phagocytosis and pinocytosis through clathrin-dependent and clathrin-independent pathways . The internalization pathways employed by target cells depend on the size, shape, material composition, surface chemistry, and/or charge of the carrier . Cargo not able to escape endosomes are trafficked to lysosomes for degradation or recycled back to the cell surface . Efficiencies of around 1% endosomal escape have been reported for most non-viral carrier strategies, including lipid nanoparticles and cell-penetrating peptides . The exact mechanisms of endosome escape are a matter of ongoing research .

Apart from endocytosis, some carriers are able to directly merge with the plasma membrane through fusion. Fusion events in biology include vesicle fusion, cell–cell fusion and cell–virus fusion. In these cases, juxtaposed membranes are pulled into close contact by specific protein–protein interactions and interfacial water is excluded to promote lipid mixing and subsequent fusion. Enveloped viruses may employ transmembrane viral proteins to mediate fusion with target cell membranes and this mechanism has been exploited for engineered intracellular delivery . An early example was the use of sendai virus to fuse pre-loaded red blood cell ghosts with the plasma membrane of target cells . A variation on this technique utilized expression of influenza hemagglutinin (HA) at the target cell membrane, which then binds sialic acid residues on the red blood cell surface to induce fusion . Virosomes, which consist of viral membrane components reconstituted into liposomes or vesicles, also exhibit fusion capabilities for the purposes of intracellular delivery. Functional virosomes have been constructed with fusion components from sendai, influenza, vesicular stomatitis and other viruses . Some exosomes and extracellular vesicles have been reported to fuse with target cells and may furthermore be engineering to fuse on demand . Interestingly, fusogenic liposomes used for protein delivery have been reported to be capable of fusion by modulating only the lipid composition without any need for the presence of fusogenic proteins or peptides . Fusogenic carriers that have been used for intracellular delivery include:

(1) cell ghosts, dead cells that have had their cytoplasm replaced with cargo,
(2) virosomes, cargo-loaded vesicles reconstituted to display functional viral proteins, and
(3) fusogenic liposomes.

Viral vectors. Viral vectors exploit the viral infection pathway to enter cells but avoid the subsequent expression of viral genes that leads to replication and pathogenicity. This is done by deleting coding regions of the viral genome and replacing them with the DNA to be delivered, which either integrates into host chromosomal DNA or exists as an episomal vector. Viral vectors were first employed for gene delivery from the 1970s, constructed from SV40 or retroviruses . Newer generations of viral vector platforms have been produced based on components from lentivirus, retrovirus, adenovirus or adeno-associated virus, and other viruses . While highly efficient for DNA delivery, notable weaknesses of viral vectors are (1) labor-intensive and expensive protocols, (2) safety issues, (3) risk of causing immune/ inflammatory responses, (4) integration into the genome with recombinant vectors, (5) risk of insertional genotoxicity, and (6) limited packaging capacity (Adeno and AAV typically restricted to carry 5−7.5 kb).

Nanoparticles for transfection. The most commonly used nanoparticles for intracellular delivery of nucleic acids are based on assemblies of cationic lipids and polymers. These cationic molecules condense DNA plasmids (~50-200 nm), mRNA (10-100 nm) and other nucleic acids (see above table "Properties of common molecules of interest for intracellular delivery") into compact nanoparticles with dimensions down to tens of nanometers. The positive charge of these particles facilitates their attraction to the cell surface due to the natural negative charge of most animal cells (−35 to −80 mV membrane potential). Upon binding, endocytosis is thought to be most efficient for particles in the size range below 100 nm . Complexation into nanoparticles also confers protection for nucleic acids against degradation until they are released inside the cell .

From the 1960s onwards it was observed that mixing nucleic acids with cationic molecules leads to the formation of macromolecular complexes that can transfect cells. Two early examples include the polymer diethylaminoethyl-dextran(DEAE-dextran)/nucleic acid combination (1968) and the insoluble ionic salt calcium phosphate/nucleic acid precipitant (1973) . The use of cationic lipids for transfection began in the 1980s, was termed "lipofection", and became the basis for the popular product lipofectamine launched in 1993. Other cationic transfection reagents were developed in the 1990s based on dendrimers such as PAMAM in 1993 ("superfect" reagent launched in late 1990s) and cationic polymers such as PEI in 1995 (marketed as "polyjet" soon after). As of 2026, most nucleic acid transfection has performed with lipid reagents, with polymer reagents and electroporation as other major options. On the other hand, certain sensitive cells or in vivo applications may be better suited for viral vectors .

=== Historical Milestones in the Development and Application of Intracellular Delivery Methods ===
Year	Membrane Disruption-Mediated	Carrier-Mediation
pre-1970
1911	Invention of microinjection	
1958	Microinjection to perform transplant of Xenopus frog cell nucleus	
1962	Microinjection of purified protein into Amoeba cells.; Microinjection of sperm into Sea Urchin egg cells (precursor to in vitro fertilization concept (IVF) in animal cells)	
1965	Detergent Tween-80 used to transiently permeabilize and deliver a small molecule (Green S) into cultured cancer cells	RNA transfection using the cationic polymer DEAE-dextran (RNA + DEAE nanoparticles)
1966	Microinjection of mammalian cells (mouse eggs)	
1967	Hypotonic shock for loading molecules into red blood cells (RBCs)	
1968		DNA transfection using the cationic polymer DEAE-dextran (DNA + DEAE-dextran nanoparticles)
1970s
1971		Liposomes deliver drugs into liver cells in vivo
1972	Electroporation demonstrated in lipid vesicles	
1973	Microinjection into human cell nucleus.; Microinjection of mRNA	Induced cell-cell fusion.; DNA transfection with Calcium Phosphate + DNA
1974		Fusion of red blood cell (RBC) ghosts with cells
1975		Virus induced cell-cell fusion
1976	Detergent Tween-80 used to delivery nucleotides into cultured animal cells	Viral vectors for DNA transduction
1977	Microinjection of plasmid DNA.; Electroporation of red blood cells	Microcell-mediated chromosome transfer
1978		Liposomal mRNA delivery
1979	Microinjection of fluorescently labelled proteins into cultured fibroblasts for microscopy experiments	
1980s
1980	Microinjection of DNA into mouse embryos produces transgenic animals	Liposomal DNA delivery
1981		Retroviral vectors for gene transduction
1982	Intracellular delivery of proteins by hypo-osmotic shock.; Electroporation for DNA transfection in animal cells.; Intracellular deliery by "Osmotic Lysis of Pinosomes" method	
1983		
1984	Laser-based Optoporation for DNA transfection in animal cells; Scrape loading delivers macromolecules into animal cells	DNA transfection using the cationic polymer Polybrene
1985		
1986	Sonoporation: Sonication demonstrates intracellular delivery of macromolecules	
1987	Ballistic gene gun transfects nucleic acids into plant cells.; Glass bead loading delivers macromolecules into animal cells	Transfection of specific cell types via targeting surface receptors.; DNA transfection using the cationic polymer Poly-L-Lysine.; "Lipofection": DNA transfection using DOTMA lipid
1988		
1989	Intracellular delivery with Streptolysin O (SLO) toxin	"Lipofection": RNA transfection using DOTMA lipid
1990s
1990		DNA transfection with nanoparticle targeting transferrin receptor
1991	In vitro fertilization (IVF) performed with microinjection: First human pregnancies generated by intracytoplasmic sperm injection (ICSI)	
1992	Syringe loading technique	
1993	Laser-induced shock waves for permeabilizing cells	Dendrimer-based transfection approacht: PAMAM + DNA.; "Lipofectamine" launched as a commercial transfection reagent
1994	Lithotripter-induced shock waves for permeabilizing cells	
1995		DNA transfection using the cationic polymer Polyethylenimine (PEI)
1996	Optimized Saponin Protocol	Lentiviral vectors introduced for DNA transduction
1997	Cone-plate viscometer for permeabilizing cells.; Cooling-heating cycles for permeabilizing cells	Cell-penetrating peptides (CPPs) introduced
1998		Chitosan-mediated DNA transfection
1999	Filtroporation; Microscale Electroporation introduced	
2000s
2000		Silica nanoparticles for DNA transfection
2001		siRNA transfection with lipid reagents
2002		Magnetofection: magnetic nanoparticles for DNA transfection.; Gold nanoparticles for DNA transfection
2003	particle-nucleated cavitation.; nanoneedle-mediated intracellular delivery	
2004		Carbon nanotubes (CNTs) for intracellular delivery of proteins
2005	carbon nanotube spearing	
2006		Polymer vesicles for DNA transfection.; Induced pluripotent stem cells (iPSCs) produced by introducing 4 genes through viral vector transduction
2007	nanopipette injection.; cavitation in microfluidics	Exosomes as carriers of RNA between cells
2008	shear-based loading with microfluidics	
2009	Fluid FM (AFM-based microinjection).; inkjet-printer mediated intracellular delivery into cells	Induced pluripotent stem cells (iPSCs) produced by using CPPs for direct delivery of proteins
2010s
2010	Nanoneedle delivery of diverse materials	Induced pluripotent stem cells (iPSCs) produced by delivering mRNA with lipid nanoparticles
2011	Nanoelectroporation	
2012	Microfluidic cell squeezing.; Hollow Nanostraws	
2013		Hematopoietic stem cell (HSCs) gene therapies produced by lentiviral vectors.; CRISPR gene editing demonstrated in living cells via lipofection of CRISPR components
2014		
2015	massively parallel light-triggered cavitation bubbles	Cationic lipids used for intracellular delivery of genome editing proteins
2016		
2017	cell squeezing + electroporation produces nuclear delivery	1st in-vivo gene therapy approved: Luxturna - Adeno-associated viral (AAV) RPE65 transgene delivery.; 1st approved CAR-T cell therapy: Tisagenlecleucel (Kymriah) - patient T cells reprogrammed by lentiviral vectors to express a receptor targeting malignant CD19 protein.; 1st ex vivo autologous hematopoietic stem cell (HSC)-based gene therapy approved: Strimvelis produced through ex vivo gamma retroviral vector gene delivery of a functional adenosine deaminase (ADA) gene into HSCs
2018	Cell collision in microfluidic T-junctions for controlled disruption of cell membranes	1st approved siRNA drug: Patisiran, delivers siRNA into patient liver cells using lipid nanoparticles (LNPs)
2019		Zolgensma approved: Adeno-associated viral (AAV) vector-mediated SMN1 transgene delivery for treatment of spinal muscular atrophy
2020s
2020		Pfzier and Moderna covid vaccines deliver mRNA into patient cells using lipid nanoparticles (LNPs)
2021	Photothermal nanofibres permeabilize cells for delivery when excited by lasers	
2022		
2023	low-cost Filtroporation used for CRISPR-based gene knockout in HSCs	Exosomes loaded with collagen mRNA achieve protein replacement therapy in a mouse model of photoaged skin.
2024	microfluidic squeezing of cells inside droplets.; acoustothermal transfection claims heat + fluid shear mechanism to permeabilize cells.; viscoelastic mechanoporation: Cells permeabilized using a viscoelastic extensional flow without surface contact	
2025		
2026	Nanolancets in flow-through microchannels for disrupting plasma and nuclear membrane simultaneously	Mechanistic studies on the entrance of CPP-protein cargos suggests the emergence of transient water pores driven by cell membrane potential

== Technical Advances ==
=== Improving Precision of Membrane Disruption ===
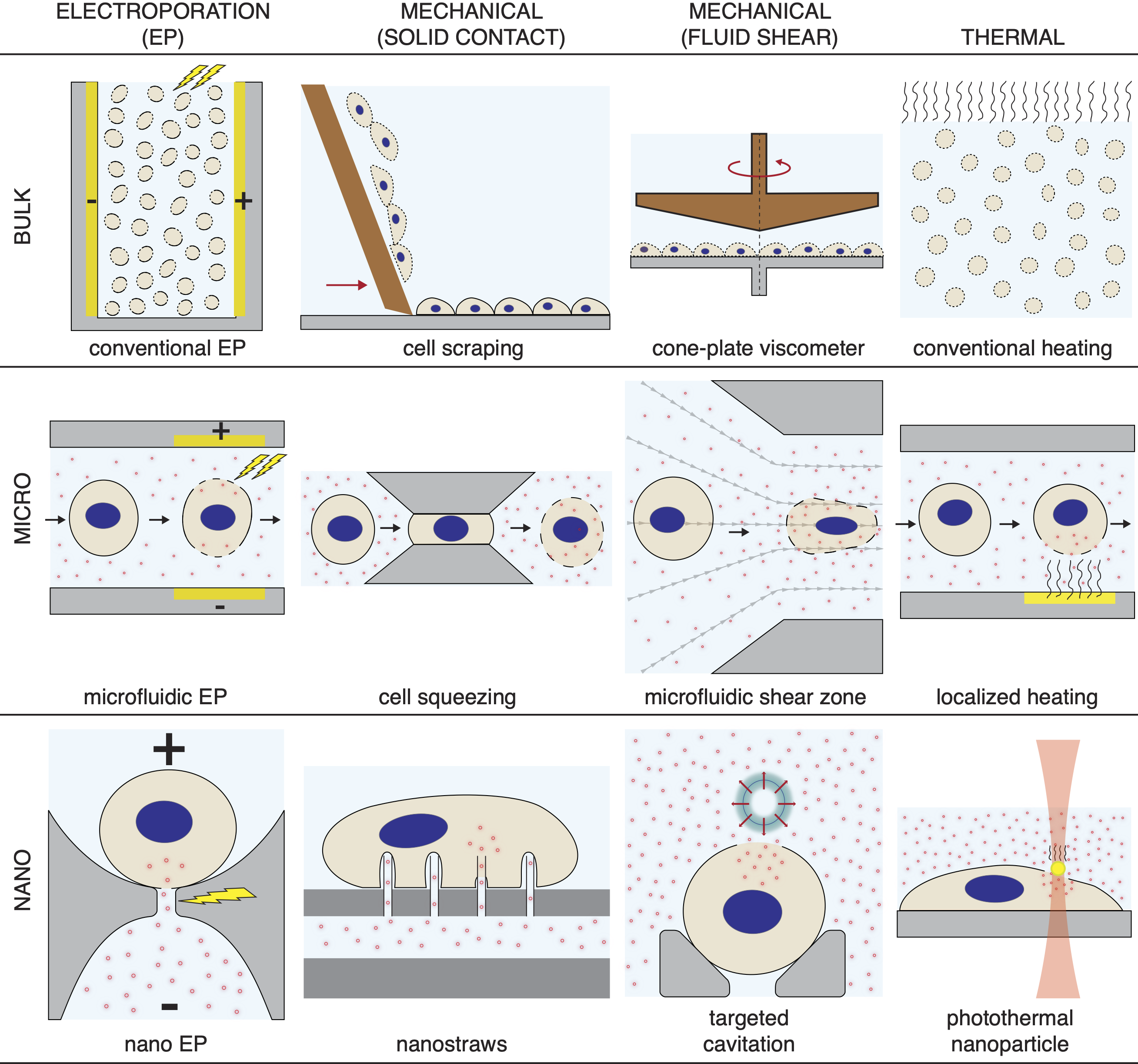
Illustration of how bulk, micro-, and nano-scale engineering has been applied to improve precision of electrical, mechanical, and thermal modes of membrane disruption-based intracellular delivery. Materials to be delivered are shown as red dots.

Advancements in microfabrication, nanotechnology, chemistry and other research fields have contributed to the improvements in precision and performance of intracellular delivery methods .

Electroporation. Early versions of electroporation used bulk electrodes to apply electrical pulses of defined voltage to cells in solution in a cuvette . Electroporation was then brought down to the microscale through the use of microfluidics in the late 90s . Following that nano-electroporation was achieved through the use of nanoapertures and nanostraws. The nano and micro versions of electroporation feature much higher precision and control over the size and location of membrane disruptions imposed on target cells . Companies such as Maxcyte and CyteQuest have developed high-throughput versions of flow electroporation that can process hundreds of millions of cells in minutes. Furthermore, other research groups have employed deep learning to improve electroporation parameters in high throughput multi-well systems .

Mechanical Contact. The first versions of intracellular delivery protocols exploiting the mechanical force of objects striking the cell membrane were simple and crude methods such as scrape loading and glass bead loading . In scrape loading, for example, a spatula is dragged across adherent cells that have been cultured on a flat substrate. As the cells peel off the substrate they undergo a variable amount of membrane damage and are able to take up molecules in solution. Scrape and bead loading have been used in many biological studies to introduce proteins and small molecules into cells .

Since the 1990s researchers have worked to improve the precision of solid contract-based membrane disruption through the use of nanoneedles and microfabricated devices . Nanoneedles were first used for nucleic acid transfection in 2003 then demonstrated delivery of diverse cargoes in 2010 . They have been combined with electroporation, flow reservoirs, and detergents to add more functionality . Moreover, nanostraws have been used to both insert and extract molecules into cells in a time-resolved manner .

In 1999 it was found that passing cells through holes in polycarbonate filters created temporary disruptions in the cell membrane to achieve DNA transfection . The method was termed "filtroporation" and did not receive much attention at the time. In 2012 researchers at MIT found that passing cells through constrictions in silicon microfluidic devices was capable of disrupting the cell membrane to achieve intracellular delivery of diverse materials . The method, termed cell squeezing, was spun out into a company called SQZ biotech that focused on leveraging intracellular delivery technology to develop cell-based therapies. By adjusting the flow speed of cells and the shape and size of microfluidic constrictions, cell squeezing can be tailored for different cell types and delivery applications. Other research groups have demonstrated the cell squeezing concept in microsieves and PDMS-based microfluidic devices . Furthermore, a low-cost filtroporation setup using filters functionalized with fluorinated silane demonstrated CRISPR RNP-based gene knockout in human CD34+ hematopoietic stem cells and filtroporation was found to cause fewer transcriptional disturbances than electroporation.

Cell squeezing has been combined with electroporation to achieve rapid delivery of DNA and other materials into the nucleus . This works by first introducing holes into the plasma membrane, then having an electrical pulse serve to 1) disrupt the nuclear membrane, and 2) drive negatively charged nucleic acids into the cell . Microfluidic cell squeezing followed by downstream electroporation has been shown to cause temporary disruptions in nuclear membrane that were repaired within 15 minutes . Similar results were obtained with a cell squeezing channel featuring high aspect ratio nanolancets to simultaneously rupture the plasma membrane and nuclear envelope to induce direct delivery of DNA into the nucleus followed by rapid gene expression.

Fluid Shear. Early examples of using fluid shear forces to controllably disrupt the cell membrane include conventional ultrasound, syringe loading for cells in suspension and the use of cone-plate viscometers on adherent cells . In syringe loading, suspensions of cells are sucked and expelled from a syringe through a fine needle tip. The fluid shear forces at the tip of the needle depend upon the flow velocity and can be tailored to disrupt the cell membrane. Since the 1990s, more precise strategies to employ fluid shear forces to permeabilize cells include microfluidics, ultrasound, shock waves, and laser-based methods .

Laser irradiance of an absorbent object in an aqueous environment can produce a variety of effects including cavitation, plasma production, chemical reactions, and heat . Both laser-particle and laser-surface interactions have been exploited to create cavitation events that expose cells to locally concentrated fluid shear forces. For example, a metallic nanostructure can be used as a seed structure to harvest short laser pulse energy and convert it into highly localized explosive vapor bubbles. A high throughput version of this concept was unveiled in 2015. Substrates arrayed with pores lined by metallic absorbers were irradiated to generate exploding cavitation bubbles underneath the basal side of adherent cells. Membrane permeabilization was synchronized with active pumping of cargo through the pores to successfully introduce living bacteria (>1 micron) into the cytoplasm of several cell types.

Thermal Effects. A simple way of delivering molecules into cells is to heat the plasma membrane until holes form. At sufficiently high temperatures, lipid bilayers will dissociate due to kinetic energy of the constituent molecules being greater than the forces that maintain the membrane formation, namely the hydrophobic forces that repel water from the lipid tails. The downside of this method is that it is incredibly non-specific and may cause excessive harm to cells. Strategies for permeabilizing cells by thermal means include:

(1) cycling cells through a cooling−heating cycle, which may or may not involve freezing,

(2) heating cells to supraphysiological temperatures, and

(3) transient intense heating of a small part of the cell.

In the latter case, thermal inkjet printers have been successfully used for intracellular delivery and transfection in animal cells. Laser-particle interactions have also been reported to thermally disrupt cell membranes. Gold nanoparticles were packed into a dense surface layer where >10 s of infrared laser irradiation heats the underside of cells to trigger permeabilization and delivery of dyes, dextrans and plasmids. In 2021 this concept was developed further when researchers showed that light-sensitive iron oxide nanoparticles embedded in biocompatible electrospun nanofibres can trigger membrane permeabilization by photothermal effects without direct contact between cells and nanoparticles . This method was capable of delivering CRISPR–Cas9 machinery and siRNA to adherent and suspension cells, including embryonic stem cells and hard-to-transfect T cells.

=== Biochemical Modification of Cargo and Carriers ===
mRNA medicines. Advances in lipid nanoparticle formulation and nucleic acid chemistry have been critical in the development of nucleic acid therapeutics, such as mRNA vaccines. For example, cationic ionizable lipids, with an acid dissociation constant (pKa) close to the early endosomal pH, enable endosomal release into the cytoplasm after endocytosis and were employed in mRNA vaccines used during the covid-19 pandemic. In the Moderna covid vaccine lipid nanoparticles were composed of ionizable lipid SM-102, cholesterol, 1,2-distearoyl-snglycero-3 phosphocholine (DSPC) and PEG2000-DMG to encapsulate mRNA. The Pfizer/BioNTech covid vaccines employed ALC-0315 lipid from Acuitas Therapeutics and formulated it with cholesterol, DSPC, and a PEG-Lipid (ALC-0159) together with mRNA . After intramuscular injection, the nanoparticles enter cells, mRNA is released into the cytoplasm, and the expression of SARS-CoV2 spike protein occurs in patient cells to elicit an immune response against the covid-19 virus.
Safety and toxicity issues related to these lipids have become apparent since 2020. Ionizable lipids can induce endosomal disruption but also cause excessive immune activation, inflammation, and hepatotoxicity. PEG-lipids, although useful for enhancing circulation time and colloidal stability, have been linked to the generation of anti-PEG antibodies, hypersensitivity reactions, and complement activation. Thus, improved and safer delivery materials are a key area of research for mRNA medicines.

siRNA Medicines. patisiran, the first siRNA based medicine to receive regulatory approval from the FDA in 2018, is based on lipid nanoparticle formulations that package and deliver siRNA to the liver for the silencing of an abnormal pathogenic form of the transthyretin gene. The therapeutic siRNA is formulated with 2 lipid excipients, DLin-MC3-DMA and PEG2000-C-DMG, in a lipid nanoparticle that is intravenously infused into the patient and targets hepatocytes in the liver. Moreover, chemically modified nucleotides in the siRNA molecules improve chemical stability, assist in targeting certain cell types, and are designed to reduce adverse immunological reactions . Diverse ligands including small molecules, carbohydrates, aptamers, peptides and antibodies have been covalently linked to siRNA in order to improve cellular uptake and target specific cell types. For example, GalNAc-siRNA conjugates not only provide an approach for ligand based cell internalization without the need for cationic materials, but also target hepatocytes specifically . GalNAc-siRNA conjugates were employed in the second FDA-approved siRNA medicine, Givosiran, which is administered to treat acute Hepatic Porphyria by down-regulating ALAS1 expression in the liver.

ASO Medicines. The first approved antisense oligonucleotides (ASO) medication was unveiled in 1998 with fomivirsen, a 21-mer oligonucleotide that blocks the translation of cytomegalovirus mRNA . By binding pre-mRNA or mRNA, ASOs can post-transcriptionally regulate protein synthesis through mechanisms including modification of pre-mRNA processing and splicing, competitive inhibition, steric blockade of translational machinery, and degradation of bound target RNA . Chemical modifications of ASO nucleosides, nucleobases, and the internucleoside backbone are key for improving pharmacokinetics and pharmacodynamics while maintaining target affinity and efficacy. Therapeutically effective ASOs are heavily modified, so they do not require a carrier for intracellular delivery. Most medically applicable ASOs are naked molecules that are able to enter cells through endocytosis and exert their therapeutic effects by binding their intracellular target .

Improved Viral Vectors. Until 2018, nearly 70% of gene therapy clinical trials utilized viral vectors for the gene delivery step. Adenovirus, Adeno-associated virus (AAV) and lentiviral vectors have been the main viral vectors used in biotechnology and clinical applications. AAV-based vectors have been a prominent example of the improvements made in viral vectors. Vector engineering can improve AAV transduction efficiency (by optimizing the transgene cassette), vector tropism (using capsid engineering) and the ability of the capsid and transgene to avoid the host immune response (by genetically modifying these components), as well as optimize the large-scale production of AAV. Moreover, vector engineering approaches, including directed evolution, have enhanced the efficiency and targeting of AAV vectors, resulting in >100-fold improvements in delivery efficiency in some cases. In another example of AAV engineering, machine learning has been applied to generate AAV variants that can circumvent immune responses from previous exposure.

Virus-like Particles. Virus-like particles (VLPs) are assemblies of viral proteins that package cargo materials such as mRNAs, proteins, or RNPs in addition to, or instead of, viral genetic material. Because VLPs are derived from existing viral scaffolds, they exploit natural properties of viruses that enable efficient intracellular delivery, including their ability to encapsulate cargos, escape endosomes, and be reprogrammed to target different cell types. However, unlike viruses, VLPs can deliver their cargo as mRNA or protein instead of only DNA, which substantially reduces the risks of viral genome integration. VLPs are thus of interest for delivering molecular cargo including gene editing agents as they can offer some of the benefits of both viral and non-viral delivery. Engineered DNA-free VLPs have been shown to package and deliver base editor or Cas9 ribonucleoproteins into mammalian cells for the purpose of gene editing. It has been reported that delivery of gene editing proteins with VLPs produces less off-target (potentially genotoxic) editing compared with plasmid and viral delivery in vitro.

== Ethical Issues and Reproducibility ==
Reproducibility and reliability. Since the early 2010s there has been a widespread awareness that many published scientific results cannot be reproduced or replicated, especially in the fields of biomedical research and psychology. As a subfield of biomedical research, the area of intracellular delivery is no exception. As an example, it is generally observed that intracellular delivery techniques that rely solely on disruption of the cell's plasma membrane and then passive influx of DNA plasmids lead to low or negligible gene expression. This was noted from the early days of scrape loading and bead loading. Yet, other papers reported substantial DNA transfection with the very same techniques. In other situations very impressive results obtained with a certain technique have been difficult to reproduce by others. For example, one study claimed to succeed in using cell squeezing in PDMS-based microfluidic devices to transfect DNA plasmids into hard-to-transfect cells for the purpose of genome editing. However, it is known that many researchers who attempted to replicate plasmid transfection with cell squeezing were not able to do so. Thus, such contradictory or confusing results have made it more difficult to know which reports can be relied upon. Discretion must therefore be applied when examining results from some research papers within the field of intracellular delivery.

Conflicts of interest. As with a number of areas of scientific research, conflicts of interest and ethical challenges may emerge. For example, there may be a temptation to overhype or over-interpret results as more impressive or more important in order to publish in more prestigious journals, obtain academic promotions, gain funding, or obtain support for commercialisation of an idea. Publications may sometimes be exploited for validating or advertising an idea rather than being a genuine report of interest to the research community. Subjective language may be used to communicate opinions rather than adherence to objective facts. Furthermore, academic personnel and resources can sometimes be exploited for commercial interests. Moreover, research papers published by companies may need to be scrutinised more heavily than those arising from unbiased sources.
