= DMG-PEG 2000 =

Names
- IUPAC name 1,2-Dimyristoyl-sn-glycero-3-methoxypolyethylene glycol
- Other names PEG-DMG

Identifiers
| CAS Number | 1397695-86-1 |
| 3D model (JSmol) | Interactive image |
| ChemSpider | 98644331 |
| PubChem CID | 122629501 |
- InChI: InChI=1S/C122H242O50/c1-4-6-8-10-12-14-16-18-20-22-24-26-121(123)171-119-120(172-122(124)27-25-23-21-19-17-15-13-11-9-7-5-2)118-170-117-116-169-115-114-168-113-112-167-111-110-166-109-108-165-107-106-164-105-104-163-103-102-162-101-100-161-99-98-160-97-96-159-95-94-158-93-92-157-91-90-156-89-88-155-87-86-154-85-84-153-83-82-152-81-80-151-79-78-150-77-76-149-75-74-148-73-72-147-71-70-146-69-68-145-67-66-144-65-64-143-63-62-142-61-60-141-59-58-140-57-56-139-55-54-138-53-52-137-51-50-136-49-48-135-47-46-134-45-44-133-43-42-132-41-40-131-39-38-130-37-36-129-35-34-128-33-32-127-31-30-126-29-28-125-3/h120H,4-119H2,1-3H3 Key: NLDCRRFPGOSAHV-UHFFFAOYSA-N
- SMILES: O=C(CCCCCCCCCCCCC)OCC(OC(CCCCCCCCCCCCC)=O)COCCOCCOCCOCCOCCOCCOCCOCCOCCOCCOCCOCCOCCOCCOCCOCCOCCOCCOCCOCCOCCOCCOCCOCCOCCOCCOCCOCCOCCOCCOCCOCCOCCOCCOCCOCCOCCOCCOCCOCCOCCOCCOCCOCCOCCOC

Properties
| Chemical formula | C_{122}H_{242}O_{50} |
| Molar mass | 2509.20 |
| Appearance | powder |

Hazards
- GHS labelling
| Pictograms | (GHS07: Exclamation mark) |
| Signal word | Danger |
| Hazard statements | H315, H319 |
- Except where otherwise noted, data are given for materials in their standard state (at 25 °C [77 °F], 100 kPa). Infobox references

DMG-PEG 2000 is a synthetic lipid formed by the PEGylation of myristoyl diglyceride. It is used to manufacture lipid nanoparticles that are used in mRNA vaccines, and in particular forms part of the drug delivery system for the Moderna COVID-19 vaccine.

== Main applications ==
DMG-PEG 2000 has similar chemical properties to the phospholipids that make up the cell membrane. This enables lipid nanoparticles composed of it to easily merge with the cell membrane, delivering its contents.

== See also ==
Moderna COVID-19 vaccine nanoparticle ingredients

- Distearoylphosphatidylcholine
- SM-102
- Cholesterol
