= Patisiran =

Pharmaceutical drug

Clinical data
- Trade names: Onpattro
- Other names: ALN-18328
- AHFS/Drugs.com: Monograph
- License data: US DailyMed: Patisiran
- Pregnancy category: AU: D
- Routes of administration: Intravenous
- ATC code: N07XX12 (WHO)

Legal status
- Legal status: AU: S4 (Prescription only); CA: ℞-only; US: ℞-only; EU: Rx-only

Identifiers
- CAS Number: 1420706-45-1
- DrugBank: DB14582
- UNII: 50FKX8CB2Y
- KEGG: D11116; as salt: D10794

Chemical and physical data
- Formula: C_{412}H_{520}N_{148}O_{290}P_{40}
- Molar mass: 13424.388 g·mol^{−1}

Patisiran, sold under the brand name Onpattro, is a medication used for the treatment of polyneuropathy in people with hereditary transthyretin-mediated amyloidosis, a fatal rare disease that is estimated to affect 50,000 people worldwide.

It is the first small interfering RNA-based drug approved by the U.S. Food and Drug Administration (FDA) and the first drug approved by the FDA to treat this condition. It is a gene silencing drug that interferes with the production of an abnormal form of transthyretin (TTR). Patisiran utilizes a novel approach to target and reduce production of the TTR protein in the liver via the RNAi pathway.

Patisiran was developed and is marketed by Alnylam. The FDA considers it to be a first-in-class medication.

== History ==
Patisiran was granted orphan drug status, fast track designation, priority review and breakthrough therapy designation due to its novel mechanism and the rarity of the condition it treats. It was approved for medical use in the United States and in the European Union in August 2018. The per-patient cost is between US$451,430 and US$677,145 per year, depending on the number of vials needed.

== Formulation ==
The siRNA active component of Patisiran is formulated into lipid nanoparticles, which protect the RNA and facilitate its delivery to target tissues. The lipid nanoparticle formulation includes buffer components, as well as the lipid components DLin-MC3-DMA, Distearoylphosphatidylcholine, cholesterol, and the PEGylated lipid DMG-PEG 2000.

== Society and culture ==
=== Economics ===
As of 2020, there were 1050 people globally receiving patisiran, generating $65.5M in net-revenues for Alnylam Pharmaceuticals.
