= MAPDA =

MAPDA can refer to:

- MAPDA awards, from the Australian Museums and Galleries Association
- Mothers Against Prescription Drug Abuse, a non-profit that partnered with the Philadelphia Phillies
- N6-Methyl-AMP deaminase, an enzyme encoded by the gene MAPDA
