= Adenosine deaminase 2 =

Enzyme found in humans

ADA2
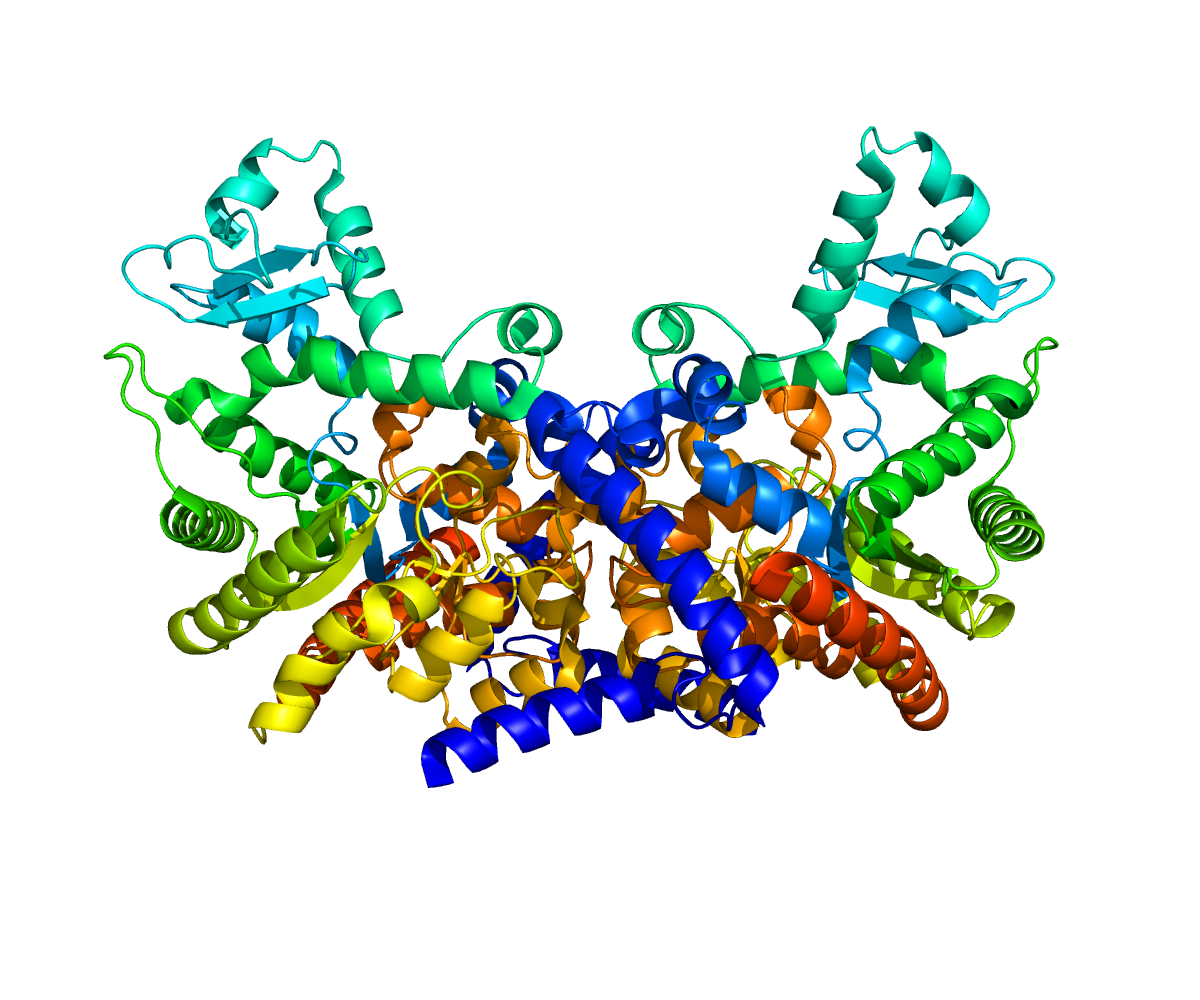

Identifiers
- Aliases: ADA2, ADGF, IDGFL, PAN, SNEDS, CECR1, cat eye syndrome chromosome region, candidate 1, adenosine deaminase 2, VAIHS
- External IDs: OMIM: 607575; GeneCards: ADA2
Available structures
PDB	Human UniProt search: PDBe RCSB
PDB	List of PDB id codes 3LGD, 3LGG
Enzyme activity
EC #	BRENDA	ExPASy	KEGG	MetaCyc
3.5.4.4	↗	↗	↗	↗

Gene location (Human)
Chr.	Chromosome 22 (human)
Band	22q11.1	Start	17,178,790 bp
Band	22q11.1	End	17,258,235 bp
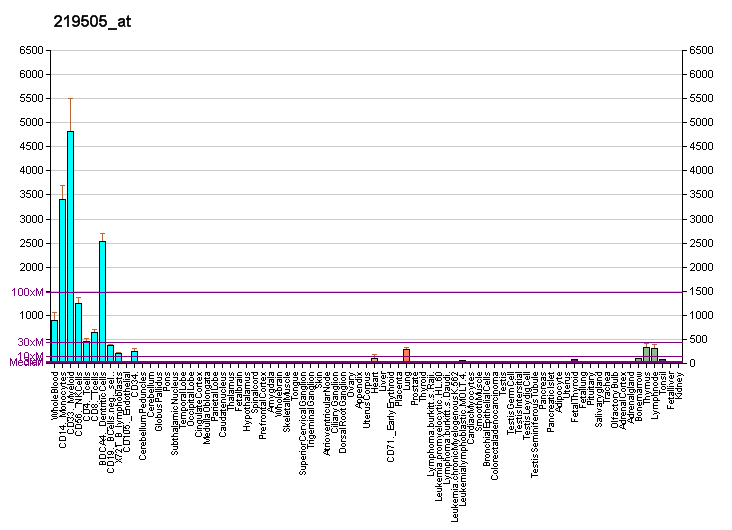
RNA expression pattern
Bgee	Human / Mouse (ortholog); Top expressed in: monocyte; granulocyte; bone marrow cell; right uterine tube; spleen; blood; lymph node; thymus; sperm; gallbladder / n/a; More reference expression data
BioGPS	More reference expression data
Gene ontology
Molecular function	deaminase activity; zinc ion binding; adenosine receptor binding; adenosine deaminase activity; heparin binding; hydrolase activity; protein homodimerization activity; metal ion binding; proteoglycan binding; growth factor activity
Cellular component	extracellular region; extracellular space; azurophil granule lumen; cytosol
Biological process	multicellular organism development; neutrophil degranulation; hypoxanthine salvage; inosine biosynthetic process; adenosine catabolic process; regulation of signaling receptor activity; signal transduction
Sources:Amigo / QuickGO
Orthologs
Databases	NCBI: entry; OMA: entry
Species	Human	Mouse
Entrez	51816	n/a
Ensembl	ENSG00000093072	n/a
UniProt	Q9NZK5	n/a
RefSeq (mRNA)	NM_001282225; NM_001282226; NM_001282227; NM_001282228; NM_001282229 NM_017424; NM_177405	n/a
RefSeq (protein)	NP_001269154; NP_001269155; NP_001269156; NP_001269157; NP_001269158 NP_803124	n/a
Location (UCSC)	Chr 22: 17.18 – 17.26 Mb	n/a
PubMed search		n/a
- Wikidata
View/Edit Human

Adenosine deaminase 2 is an enzyme that in humans is encoded by the ADA2 gene (previously CECR1).

This enzyme is one of the two main types of adenosine deaminase found in humans, which regulate levels of adenosine, a signaling molecule. This specific enzyme is secreted by monocytes which are differentiating, and may be involved in the regulation of cell proliferation and differentiation.

It may be responsible for some of the phenotypic features associated with cat eye syndrome.
