= SM-102 =

Names
- Preferred IUPAC name 9-Heptadecanyl 8-{(2-hydroxyethyl)[6-oxo-6-(undecyloxy)hexyl]amino}octanoate
- Other names 1-Octylnonyl 8-[(2-hydroxyethyl)[6-oxo-6-(undecyloxy)hexyl]amino]octanoate

Identifiers
CAS Number	2089251-47-6
3D model (JSmol)	Interactive image
ChemSpider	109107894
PubChem CID	126697616
UNII	T7OBQ65G2I
CompTox Dashboard (EPA)	DTXSID301336730
- InChI: InChI=1S/C44H87NO5/c1-4-7-10-13-16-17-18-24-32-41-49-43(47)35-29-25-31-38-45(39-40-46)37-30-23-19-22-28-36-44(48)50-42(33-26-20-14-11-8-5-2)34-27-21-15-12-9-6-3/h42,46H,4-41H2,1-3H3 Key: BGNVBNJYBVCBJH-UHFFFAOYSA-N
- SMILES: CCCCCCCCCCCOC(=O)CCCCCN(CCCCCCCC(=O)OC(CCCCCCCC)CCCCCCCC)CCO

Properties
Chemical formula	C_{44}H_{87}NO_{5}
Molar mass	710.182 g·mol^{−1}
- Except where otherwise noted, data are given for materials in their standard state (at 25 °C [77 °F], 100 kPa). Infobox references

SM-102 is a synthetic amino lipid which is used in combination with other lipids to form lipid nanoparticles. These are used for the delivery of mRNA-based vaccines, and in particular SM-102 forms part of the drug delivery system for the Moderna COVID-19 vaccine.

Lipid nanoparticles are an extension of earlier RNA transfection methods such as cationic liposomes. Such systems are needed to protect the delicate mRNA molecules and shuttle them into cells without the immune system destroying them first. The nanoparticles enter the cells by triggering receptor-mediated endocytosis.

Ionisable lipids like SM-102 hold a relatively (/ close to) neutral charge at physiological pH but are positively charged within the nanoparticle (the amine group is protonated to form an ammonium cation). This allows them to bind to the negatively charged backbone of mRNA. The rest of the nanoparticle is formed from PEGylated lipids, which help stabilize the particle, and phospholipids and cholesterol molecules that contribute to the particle’s structure.

SM-102 is also used for non-invasive bioluminescence imaging when SM-102 containing luciferase-encoding mRNA is used for in-vivo luciferase expression in animal models.

== Synthesis ==
The preparation of SM-102 was first described in a patent application to lipid nanoparticles by Moderna in 2017. The final step is an alkylation reaction in which a secondary amine is combined with a lipid bromo ester.

HO(CH_{2})_{2}NH(CH_{2})_{7}CO_{2}CH(C_{8}H_{17})_{2} + Br(CH_{2})_{5}CO_{2}C_{11}H_{23} → SM-102

== See also ==
- ALC-0315

Moderna COVID-19 vaccine nanoparticle ingredients

- Distearoylphosphatidylcholine
- DMG-PEG 2000
