= Philip Felgner =

American biochemist and immunologist

- Born: Philip Louis Felgner; 7 February 1950 (age 76); Frankenmuth, Michigan, U.S.
- Education: Michigan State University (B.S., M.S., Ph.D)
- Known for: Lipofection technologies Lipid nanoparticles DNA vaccines Protein microarrays
- Awards: Princess of Asturias Awards for Technical and Scientific Research (2021); Robert Koch Prize (2022); A.D. Bangham FRS Life Achievement Award (2022); National Academy of Inventors Fellow (2022)
- Scientific career
- Fields: mRNA vaccines; Microarrays; Genetics; Nanoscience; Immunology
- Workplaces: University of California, Irvine; Vical Inc. Syntex; Salk Institute for Biological Studies
- Thesis: (1978)

Philip Louis Felgner (born 7 February 1950) is an American biochemist and immunologist known for his work on lipofection technology and nucleic acid delivery systems. His research has focused on the development of lipid-based methods for introducing nucleic acids into cells and their applications in gene delivery and vaccination. He is currently a Professor of Physiology & Biophysics at the University of California, Irvine (UCI), where he serves as Director of the UCI Vaccine Research & Development Center and the Protein Microarray Laboratory and Training Facility.

Felgner's work on cationic lipid-based nucleic acid transfection and the demonstration that direct injection of nucleic acids can result in in vivo protein expression contributed to the development of lipid nanoparticle delivery systems and informed subsequent work on DNA vaccines and mRNA vaccines.

== Early life and education ==
Felgner was born and raised in Frankenmuth, Michigan, a small farming community with German heritage. He developed an early interest in science during a period of rapid technological advancement in the United States.

In 1972, he graduated in biochemistry from Michigan State University, earning his master's degree in 1975 and his Ph.D. in 1978. He conducted postdoctoral research at the University of Virginia, where he studied liposomes—lipid-based structures investigated for their potential use in drug delivery.

== Career and research ==
=== Development of lipofection technology ===
While working at Syntex in the mid-1980s, Felgner helped pioneer the use of synthetic cationic lipids to facilitate the delivery of nucleic acids into cells. This work introduced cationic lipid-based transfection reagents and contributed to the development of synthetic non-viral gene delivery methods. These approaches became widely used tools in molecular and cellular biology.

At the Salk Institute for Biological Studies in San Diego, California, he further investigated RNA transfection in a range of model systems, with results published in 1989.

=== Foundation of DNA and RNA vaccination ===
In 1990, while working at Vical Inc., a company he founded, Felgner collaborated with researchers at the University of Wisconsin–Madison to demonstrate that injection of plasmid DNA (pDNA) and mRNA into mouse skeletal muscle could result in protein expression. This study provided early evidence that direct administration of nucleic acids could produce proteins in vivo, an approach later explored in gene therapy and vaccine development. Subsequent research has identified this work as part of the early development of mRNA vaccine technologies.

During the COVID-19 pandemic, mRNA vaccine platforms developed by companies such as BioNTech and Moderna utilized lipid nanoparticle delivery systems related to earlier work in the field.

=== Academic career and protein microarray technology ===
In 2002, Felgner joined the faculty at UC Irvine. In addition to his work on lipid-based delivery systems, he developed large-scale protein microarray technologies for studying immune responses. His laboratory has generated extensive collections of cloned plasmids and corresponding protein arrays used to analyze antibody responses to infectious diseases.

These arrays have been applied to tens of thousands of sera samples from infected, vaccinated, and uninfected individuals, enabling the identification of immunologically relevant antigens and patterns of immune system response.

During the COVID-19 pandemic, his laboratory analyzed thousands of specimens to study immune responses to infection and vaccination. The group also developed microarray-based tools to assess exposure to SARS-CoV-2 and its variants.

Felgner has collaborated with researchers and clinicians across multiple institutions on studies related to vaccine development, immune profiling, and infectious disease diagnostics.

== Impact and recognition ==
As of 2022, Felgner has published more than 300 peer-reviewed papers that have been cited over 58,000 times. He holds numerous U.S. and international patents related to gene delivery and biotechnology.

In 2023, his work on cationic lipid-based delivery systems was referenced in background materials associated with the Nobel Prize in Physiology or Medicine in 2023.

== Honors and awards ==
Felgner has received numerous prestigious honors recognizing his contributions to science and medicine:

- Princess of Asturias Awards for Technical and Scientific Research (2021) – awarded along with Katalin Karikó, Drew Weissman, Uğur Şahin, Özlem Türeci, Derrick Rossi, and Sarah Gilbert for contributions to designing COVID-19 vaccines
- Robert Koch Prize (2022) – one of the most prestigious honors in infectious disease research and microbiology, often considered a stepping-stone to eventual Nobel Prize recognition, awarded for his fundamental contributions to the development of lipofection technology
- A.D. Bangham FRS Life Achievement Award (2022) – named in honor of Dr. Alec Douglas Bangham, known as the father of liposomes
- National Academy of Inventors Fellow (2022)
- Multiple lifetime achievement awards from leading scientific organizations
