= LACC1 =

Identifiers
- Aliases: LACC1, C13orf31, laccase domain containing 1
- External IDs: OMIM: 613409; MGI: 2445077; GeneCards: LACC1
Enzyme activity
| EC # | BRENDA | ExPASy | KEGG | MetaCyc |
|---|---|---|---|---|
| 2.4.2.1 | ↗ | ↗ | ↗ | ↗ |
| 2.4.2.28 | ↗ | ↗ | ↗ | ↗ |
| 3.5.4.4 | ↗ | ↗ | ↗ | ↗ |

Gene location (Mouse)
| Chr. | Chromosome 14 (mouse) |
| Band | 14|14 D3 | Start | 77,261,640 bp |
| Band | 14|14 D3 | End | 77,274,344 bp |
Orthologs
| Databases | NCBI: entry; OMA: entry |
| Species | Human | Mouse |
| Entrez | 144811 | 210808 |
| Ensembl | ENSG00000179630 | ENSMUSG00000044350 |
| UniProt | Q8IV20 | Q8BZT9 |
| RefSeq (mRNA) | NM_001128303; NM_153218 | NM_172488 |
| RefSeq (protein) | NP_001121775; NP_694950; NP_001337567; NP_001337568; NP_001337569 NP_001337570; NP_001337571; NP_001337572; NP_001337573; NP_001337574; NP_001337575; NP_001337576; NP_001337577 | NP_766076 |
| Location (UCSC) | n/a | Chr 14: 77.26 – 77.27 Mb |
| PubMed search |
- Wikidata
| View/Edit Human | View/Edit Mouse |

Laccase (multicopper oxidoreductase) domain containing 1 is a protein in humans that is encoded by the LACC1 gene.
