= ALC-0159 =

Names
- Other names 2-[(polyethylene glycol)-2000]-N,N-ditetradecylacetamide

Identifiers
CAS Number	1849616-42-7
3D model (JSmol)	Interactive image
ChemSpider	112747193
UNII	PJH39UMU6H
- InChI: InChI=1S/C33H67NO3/c1-4-6-8-10-12-14-16-18-20-22-24-26-28-34(33(35)32-37-31-30-36-3)29-27-25-23-21-19-17-15-13-11-9-7-5-2/h4-32H2,1-3H3 Key: BPWFJNQUTKVHIR-UHFFFAOYSA-N
- SMILES: CCCCCCCCCCCCCCN(CCCCCCCCCCCCCC)C(=O)COCCOC
- Except where otherwise noted, data are given for materials in their standard state (at 25 °C [77 °F], 100 kPa). Infobox references

ALC-0159 is a PEG/lipid conjugate (i.e. PEGylated lipid), specifically, it is the N,N-dimyristylamide of 2-hydroxyacetic acid, O-pegylated to a PEG chain mass of about 2 kilodaltons (corresponding to about 45-46 ethylene oxide units per molecule of N,N-dimyristyl hydroxyacetamide). It is a non-ionic surfactant by its nature. It has been deployed in the Pfizer-BioNTech SARS-CoV-2 mRNA vaccine (0.05 mg per dose) that contains the active ingredient tozinameran.

== See also ==
Pfizer–BioNTech COVID-19 vaccine nanoparticle ingredients

- ALC-0315
- 1,2-distearoyl-sn-glycero-3-phosphocholine
- Cholesterol

Others

- Polyethoxylated tallow amine
