= Distearoylphosphatidylcholine =

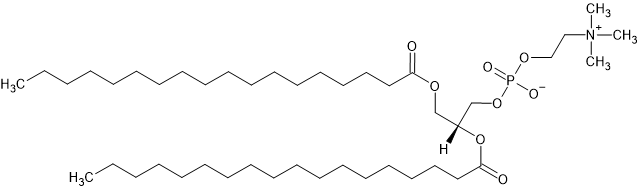

Names
- Systematic IUPAC name (2R)-2,3-Bis(octadecanoyloxy)propyl 2-(trimethylazaniumyl)ethyl phosphate
- Other names 1,2-distearoyl-sn-glycero-3-phosphocholine, DSPC, 18:0 PC

Identifiers
CAS Number	4539-70-2 (racemic); 816-94-4 (R enantiomer)
3D model (JSmol)	Interactive image
ChEBI	CHEBI:83718
ChemSpider	85004
ECHA InfoCard	100.011.309
EC Number	212-440-2
PubChem CID	94190
UNII	043IPI2M0K
CompTox Dashboard (EPA)	DTXSID20231218
- InChI: InChI=1S/C44H88NO8P/c1-6-8-10-12-14-16-18-20-22-24-26-28-30-32-34-36-43(46)50-40-42(41-52-54(48,49)51-39-38-45(3,4)5)53-44(47)37-35-33-31-29-27-25-23-21-19-17-15-13-11-9-7-2/h42H,6-41H2,1-5H3/t42-/m1/s1 Key: NRJAVPSFFCBXDT-HUESYALOSA-N
- SMILES: O=C(OC[C@@H](OC(=O)CCCCCCCCCCCCCCCCC)COP([O-])(=O)OCC[N+](C)(C)C)CCCCCCCCCCCCCCCCC

Properties
Chemical formula	C_{44}H_{88}NO_{8}P
Molar mass	790.161 g·mol^{−1}
- Except where otherwise noted, data are given for materials in their standard state (at 25 °C [77 °F], 100 kPa). Infobox references

Distearoylphosphatidylcholine is a phosphatidylcholine, a kind of phospholipid. It is a natural constituent of cell membranes, eg. soybean phosphatidylcholines are mostly different 18-carbon phosphatidylcholines (including minority of saturated DSPC), and their hydrogenation results in 85% DSPC. It can be used to prepare lipid nanoparticles which are used in mRNA vaccines, In particular, it forms part of the drug delivery system for the Moderna and Pfizer COVID-19 vaccines.

== See also ==
Moderna COVID-19 vaccine nanoparticle ingredients

- SM-102
- DMG-PEG 2000

Others

- Stearic acid, contributing stearoyl- group
- Phosphocholine
