= ALC-0315 =

Names
- Preferred IUPAC name [(4-Hydroxybutyl)azanediyl]di(hexane-6,1-diyl) bis(2-hexyldecanoate)

Identifiers
CAS Number	2036272-55-4
3D model (JSmol)	Interactive image
ChemSpider	103867294
PubChem CID	122666778
UNII	AVX8DX713V
CompTox Dashboard (EPA)	DTXSID701336663
- InChI: InChI=1S/C48H95NO5/c1-5-9-13-17-19-27-37-45(35-25-15-11-7-3)47(51)53-43-33-23-21-29-39-49(41-31-32-42-50)40-30-22-24-34-44-54-48(52)46(36-26-16-12-8-4)38-28-20-18-14-10-6-2/h45-46,50H,5-44H2,1-4H3 Key: QGWBEETXHOVFQS-UHFFFAOYSA-N
- SMILES: CCCCCCCCC(CCCCCC)C(=O)OCCCCCCN(CCCCO)CCCCCCOC(=O)C(CCCCCC)CCCCCCCC

Properties
Chemical formula	C_{48}H_{95}NO_{5}
Molar mass	766.290 g·mol^{−1}
- Except where otherwise noted, data are given for materials in their standard state (at 25 °C [77 °F], 100 kPa). Infobox references

ALC-0315 ([(4-hydroxybutyl)azanediyl]di(hexane-6,1-diyl) bis(2-hexyldecanoate)) is a synthetic lipid. A colorless oily material, it has attracted attention as a component of the SARS-CoV-2 vaccine, BNT162b2, from BioNTech and Pfizer. Specifically, it is one of four components that form lipid nanoparticles (LNPs), which encapsulate and protect the otherwise fragile mRNA that is the active ingredient in these drugs. These nanoparticles promote the uptake of therapeutically effective nucleic acids such as oligonucleotides or mRNA both in vitro and in vivo.

Below physiological pH, ALC-0315 becomes protonated at the nitrogen atom, yielding an ammonium cation that is attracted to the messenger RNA (mRNA), which is anionic.

== Synthesis ==
The preparation of ALC-0315 was first described in a patent application to lipid nanoparticles by Acuitas Therapeutics in 2017. The final step is a reductive amination reaction in which 4-aminobutanol is condensed with a lipid aldehyde, using sodium triacetoxyborohydride as the reducing agent to convert the intermediate imines to the amine of the product.

2 (C_{8}H_{17})(C_{6}H_{13})CHCO_{2}(CH_{2})_{5}CHO + H_{2}N(CH_{2})_{4}OH + 2 NaBH(O_{2}CCH_{3})_{3} → ALC-0315

== Use ==
ALC-0315 is one of the components of the BNT162b2 vaccine (0.43 mg per dose). Its chemical properties as a tertiary amine mean that its cation can form an ionic bond to the messenger RNA which carries the genetic information for the SARS-CoV-2 spike protein formation in the human body. Importantly, once the lipid nanoparticle which encapsulates the mRNA has been absorbed into antigen-presenting cells (a process called receptor-mediated endocytosis) the more acidic environment within the endosome fully protonates the ALC-0315 as a result the nanoparticle releases its payload of mRNA. In December 2021 there were objections raised against the use of ALC-0315 and ALC-0159 (and some other solid lipid nanoparticles) in humans by critics of mRNA-COVID-19 vaccines in Germany but the German pharmaceutical trade journal Pharmazeutische Zeitung (de) and the German investigative collective Correctiv refuted this and stated as one important reason that the European Medicines Agency has approved the vaccine and this includes all its ingredients.

== See also ==
Pfizer–BioNTech COVID-19 vaccine nanoparticle ingredients

- ALC-0159
- 1,2-distearoyl-sn-glycero-3-phosphocholine
- Cholesterol
