= N6-Methyl-AMP deaminase =

Enzyme found in humans

MAPDA

Identifiers
- Aliases: MAPDA, adenosine deaminase like, ADAL, N6-Methyl-AMP deaminase, ADAL1
- External IDs: MGI: 1923144; GeneCards: MAPDA

Gene location (Human)
Chr.	Chromosome 15 (human)
Band	15q15.3	Start	43,330,672 bp
Band	15q15.3	End	43,354,569 bp

Gene location (Mouse)
Chr.	Chromosome 2 (mouse)
Band	2|2 E5	Start	120,970,909 bp
Band	2|2 E5	End	120,987,161 bp
RNA expression pattern
Bgee	Human / Mouse (ortholog); Top expressed in: testicle; myocardium of left ventricle; Skeletal muscle tissue of rectus abdominis; gonad; muscle of leg; Achilles tendon; gastrocnemius muscle; muscle of thigh; tibialis anterior muscle; right atrium / Top expressed in: otolith organ; utricle; neural layer of retina; hand; superior cervical ganglion; spermatocyte; retinal pigment epithelium; tail of embryo; lobe of cerebellum; proximal tubule; More reference expression data
BioGPS	n/a
Gene ontology
Molecular function	deaminase activity; hydrolase activity; metal ion binding; adenosine deaminase activity
Cellular component	cytosol
Biological process	purine-containing compound salvage; nucleotide metabolic process; adenosine catabolic process; hypoxanthine salvage; inosine biosynthetic process
Sources:Amigo / QuickGO
Orthologs
Databases	NCBI: entry; OMA: entry
Species	Human	Mouse
Entrez	161823	75894
Ensembl	ENSG00000168803	ENSMUSG00000027259
UniProt	Q6DHV7	Q80SY6
RefSeq (mRNA)	NM_001012969; NM_001159280; NM_001324364; NM_001324365; NM_001324366 NM_001324367; NM_001324368	NM_001290811; NM_001290812; NM_029475; NM_001355748
RefSeq (protein)	NP_001012987; NP_001152752; NP_001311293; NP_001311294; NP_001311295 NP_001311296; NP_001311297	NP_001277740; NP_001277741; NP_083751; NP_001342677
Location (UCSC)	Chr 15: 43.33 – 43.35 Mb	Chr 2: 120.97 – 120.99 Mb
PubMed search
- Wikidata
View/Edit Human	View/Edit Mouse

N6-Methyl-AMP deaminase, also called adenosine deaminase-like protein, is an enzyme that in humans is encoded by the gene MAPDA (previously ADAL). This enzyme functions to detoxify certain types of methylated adenosine molecules. These toxic molecules are produced by the degradation of RNAs, and need to be cleared to avoid problems with cellular metabolism.

== Function ==
MAPDA is a deaminase enzyme (EC 3.5.4.-) that catalyses the hydrolysis of 3 types of modified adenosine molecules which have the m6A (N6-methylated adenine) modification. In particular, it acts on N6-methyl-AMP (m6AMP), N6,N6-dimethyl-AMP (m6,6AMP), and N6-isopentenyl-AMP (i6AMP), and in each cases produces inositol monophosphate (IMP) along with other products. The three catalyzed reactions are:

N_{6}-methyl-AMP + H_{2}O + H+ → IMP + methylamine

N_{6},N_{6}-dimethyl-AMP + H_{2}O + H^{+} → IMP + dimethylamine

N_{6}-(dimethylallyl)adenosine 5'-phosphate + H_{2}O + H^{+} → IMP + dimethylamylamine

Without MAPDA, these methylated nucleosides accumulate, and get incorporated into DNA. A lot of earlier research was in plants, where gene knock-out leads to slightly reduced root growth.
