= Lipid-based nanoparticle =

Novel drug delivery system

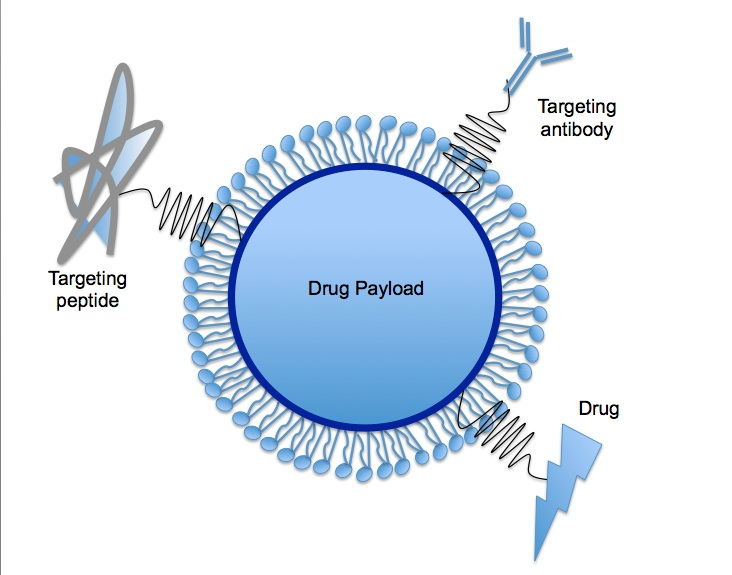
Solid lipid nanoparticles (SLNs). There is only one phospholipid layer because the bulk of the interior of the particle is composed of lipophilic substance. Payloads such as modRNA, RNA vaccine or others can be embedded in the interior, as desired. Optionally, targeting-molecules such as antibodies, cell-targeting peptides, and/or other drug molecules can be bound to the exterior surface of the SLN.

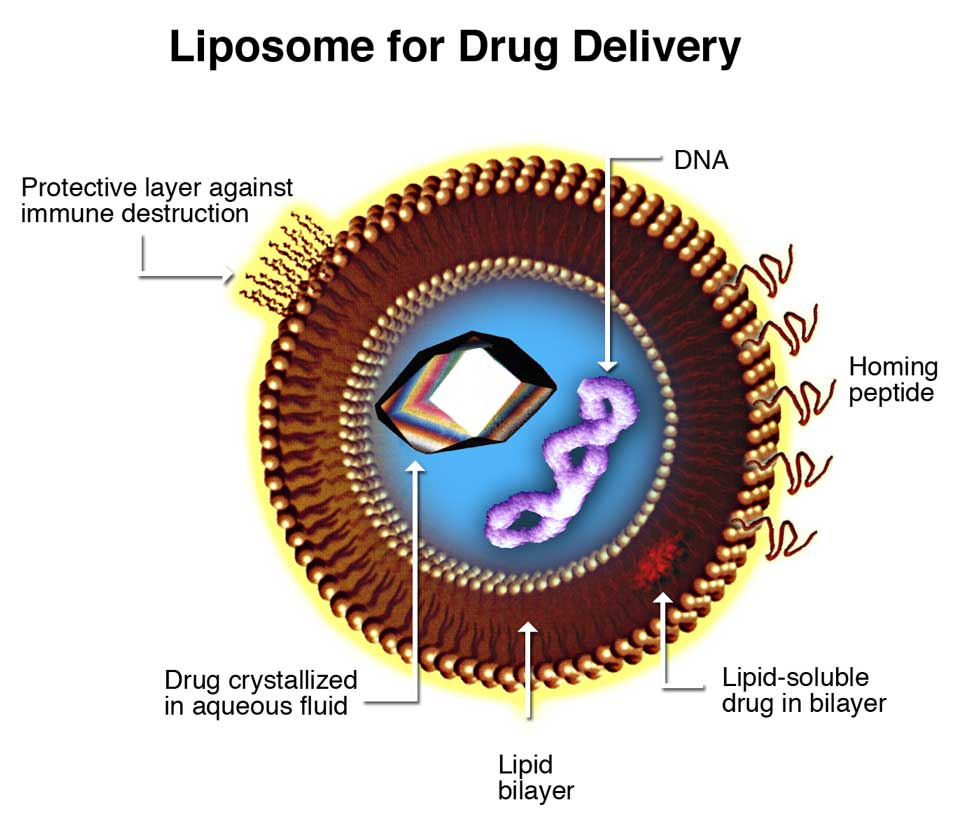
Liposomes are ("hollow") lipid nanoparticles which have a phospholipid bilayer as coat, because the bulk of the interior of the particle is composed of aqueous substance. In various popular uses, the optional payload is e.g. DNA vaccines, Gene therapy, vitamins, antibiotics, cosmetics and many others.

Lipid-based nanoparticles are very small spherical particles composed of lipids. They are a novel pharmaceutical drug delivery system (part of nanoparticle drug delivery), and a novel pharmaceutical formulation. There are many subclasses of lipid-based nanoparticles such as: lipid nanoparticles (LNPs), solid lipid nanoparticles (SLNs), and nanostructured lipid carriers (NLCs).

Sometimes the term "LNP" describes all lipid-based nanoparticles. In specific applications, LNPs describe a specific type of lipid-based nanoparticle, such as the LNPs used for the mRNA vaccine.

Using LNPs for drug delivery was first approved in 2018 for the siRNA drug Onpattro. LNPs became more widely known late in 2020, as some COVID-19 vaccines that use RNA vaccine technology coat the fragile mRNA strands with PEGylated lipid nanoparticles as their delivery vehicle (including both the Moderna and the Pfizer–BioNTech COVID-19 vaccines).

== Characteristics ==
A lipid nanoparticle is typically spherical with an average diameter between 10 and 1000 nanometers. LNPs are made up of phospholipids, cholesterols, ionizable lipids, and polyethylene glycol-derived lipids (PEGylated lipids). Each of these components play a key role in LNPs used for mRNA vaccines that target SARS-CoV-2 (the virus that causes COVID-19). The ionizable cationic lipids bind to mRNA, PEGylated lipids stabilize LNPs, and phospholipids and cholesterol give LNPs their structure. Because of rapid clearance by the immune system of the positively charged lipid, neutral ionizable amino lipids were developed. A novel squaramide lipid (a partially aromatic four-membered ring that can participate in pi–pi interactions) has been used as part of the delivery system used, for example, by Moderna.

Solid lipid nanoparticles (SLNs) possess a solid lipid core matrix that solubilizes lipophilic molecules. Surfactants (emulsifiers) stabilize the lipid core. The emulsifier used depends on administration routes, and is more limited for parenteral administrations. The term "lipid" refers to a broader class of molecules, and includes triglycerides (e.g. tristearin), diglycerides (e.g. glycerol bahenate), monoglycerides (e.g. glycerol monostearate), fatty acids (e.g. stearic acid), steroids (e.g. cholesterol), and waxes (e.g. cetyl palmitate). All classes of emulsifiers (with respect to charge and molecular weight) have been used to stabilize the lipid dispersion. It has been found that the combination of emulsifiers might prevent particle agglomeration more efficiently.

An SLN is generally spherical and consists of a solid lipid core stabilized by a surfactant. The core lipids can be fatty acids, acylglycerols, waxes, and mixtures of these surfactants. Biological membrane lipids, such as phospholipids, sphingomyelins, bile salts (sodium taurocholate), and sterols (cholesterol) are used as stabilizers. Biological lipids having minimum carrier cytotoxicity and the solid state of the lipid permit better controlled drug release due to increased mass transfer resistance.

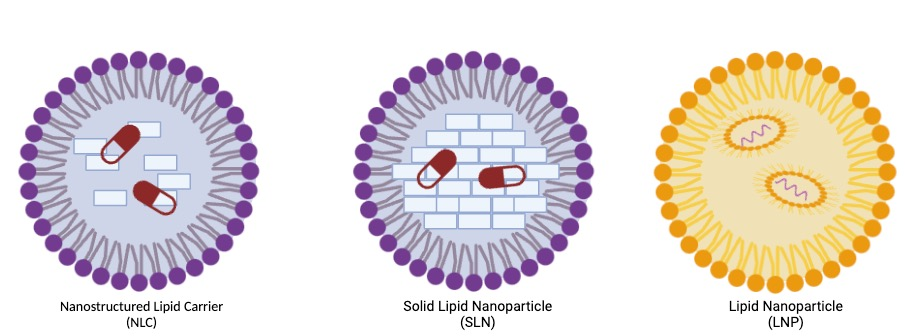
Structure of NLCs, SLNs, and LNPs

Nanostructured lipid carriers (NLCs) are lipid-based nanoparticles that contain a mixture of solid and liquid lipids in the central core of the lipid carrier. NLCs are derived from SLNs by injecting liquid lipids into the solid core, resulting in a non-uniform internal core. This modification allows for higher drug capacity and more controlled drug delivery.

== Preparation ==
Lipid-based nanoparticles are generally prepared by formulation and self-assembly processes rather than by chemical synthesis of the final particle. Common preparation methods include homogenisation, ultrasonication, solvent emulsification and evaporation, microemulsion-based methods, ethanol injection, and controlled mixing of lipid-containing organic phases with aqueous phases.

Microfluidic and other continuous-flow mixing methods are widely used for lipid nanoparticle and lipid-based nanomedicine preparation because they allow controlled mixing, continuous production, high-throughput formulation screening and improved control of particle size, polydispersity and reproducibility. In these methods, formulation composition, solvent conditions, lipid concentration, flow-rate ratio, total flow rate, temperature and downstream processing can strongly affect the final nanoparticle population.

== Applications ==
Development of solid lipid nanoparticles is one of the fields of lipid nanotechnology (for a review on lipid nanotechnology, see) with several potential applications in drug delivery, clinical medicine and research, as well as in other disciplines. Due to their size-dependent properties, lipid nanoparticles can possibly develop new therapeutics. The ability to incorporate drugs into nanocarriers offers a new prototype in drug delivery that could hold great promise for attaining bioavailability enhancement along with controlled and site-specific drug delivery. SLNs are also considered to be well tolerated in general, due to their composition from physiologically similar lipids.

The conventional approaches such as use of permeation enhancers, surface modification, prodrug synthesis, complex formation and colloidal lipid carrier-based strategies have been developed for the delivery of drugs to intestinal lymphatics. In addition, polymeric nanoparticles, self-emulsifying delivery systems, liposomes, microemulsions, micellar solutions and recently, solid lipid nanoparticles (SLN) have been exploited as probable possibilities as carriers for oral intestinal lymphatic delivery.

=== Drug delivery ===
Solid lipid nanoparticles can function as the basis for oral and parenteral drug delivery systems. SLNs combine the advantages of lipid emulsion and polymeric nanoparticle systems while overcoming the temporal and in vivo stability issues that troubles the conventional as well as polymeric nanoparticles drug delivery approaches. It has been proposed that SLNs have many advantages over other colloidal carriers i.e. incorporation of lipophilic and hydrophilic drugs feasible, no biotoxicity of the carrier, avoidance of organic solvents, possibility of controlled drug release and drug targeting, increased drug stability and no problems with respect to large scale production. Various functions such as molecules for targeting, PEG chains for stealth properties, or thiol groups for adhesion via disulfide bond formation can be immobilized on their surface. A recent study has demonstrated the use of solid lipid nanoparticles as a platform for oral delivery of the nutrient mineral iron, by incorporating the hydrophilic molecule ferrous sulfate (FeSO_{4}) in a lipid matrix composed of stearic acid. Carvedilol-loaded solid lipid nanoparticles were prepared using hot-homogenization technique for oral delivery with compritol and poloxamer 188 as the lipid and surfactant, respectively. Another example of drug delivery using SLN would be oral solid SLN suspended in distilled water, which was synthesized to trap drugs within the SLN structure. Upon ingestion, the SLNs are exposed to gastric and intestinal acids that dissolve the SLNs and release the drugs into the system.

Many nano-structured systems have been employed for ocular drug delivery. SLNs have been looked at as a potential drug carrier system since the 1990s. SLNs do not show biotoxicity as they are prepared from physiological lipids. SLNs are useful in ocular drug delivery as they can enhance the corneal absorption of drugs and improve the ocular bioavailability of both hydrophilic and lipophilic drugs. SLNs have another advantage of allowing autoclave sterilization, a necessary step towards formulation of ocular preparations.

Advantages of SLNs include the use of physiological lipids (which decreases the danger of acute and chronic toxicity), the avoidance of organic solvents, a potential wide application spectrum (dermal, per os, intravenous) and the high pressure homogenization as an established production method. Additionally, improved bioavailability, protection of sensitive drug molecules from the outer environment (e.g. water, light), and even controlled release characteristics were claimed by the incorporation of poorly water-soluble drugs in the solid lipid matrix. Moreover, SLNs can carry both lipophilic and hydrophilic drugs, and are more affordable compared to polymeric/surfactant-based carriers.

==== Nucleic acids ====
A significant obstacle to using LNPs as a delivery vehicle for nucleic acids is that in nature, lipids and nucleic acids both carry a negative electric charge—meaning they do not easily mix with each other. While working at Syntex in the mid-1980s, Philip Felgner pioneered the use of artificially-created cationic lipids (positively-charged lipids) to bind lipids to nucleic acids in order to transfect the latter into cells. However, by the late 1990s, it was known from in vitro experiments that this use of cationic lipids had undesired side effects on cell membranes.

During the late 1990s and 2000s, Pieter Cullis, while at the University of British Columbia, developed ionizable cationic lipids which are "positively charged at an acidic pH but neutral in the blood." Cullis also led the development of a technique involving careful adjustments to pH during the process of mixing ingredients in order to create LNPs which could safely pass through the cell membranes of living organisms. As of 2021, the current understanding of LNPs formulated with such ionizable cationic lipids is that they enter cells through receptor-mediated endocytosis and end up inside endosomes. The acidity inside the endosomes causes LNPs' ionizable cationic lipids to acquire a positive charge, and this is thought to allow LNPs to escape from endosomes and release their RNA payloads.

From 2005 into the early 2010s, LNPs were investigated as a drug delivery system for small interfering RNA (siRNA) drugs. In 2009, Cullis co-founded a company called Acuitas Therapeutics to commercialize his LNP research; Acuitas worked on developing LNPs for Alnylam Pharmaceuticals's siRNA drugs. In 2018, the FDA approved Alnylam's siRNA drug Onpattro (patisiran), the first drug to use LNPs as the drug delivery system.

By that point in time, siRNA drug developers like Alnylam were already looking at other options for future drugs like chemical conjugate systems, but during the 2010s, the earlier research into using LNPs for siRNA became a foundation for new research into using LNPs for mRNA. Lipids intended for short siRNA strands did not work well for much longer mRNA strands, which led to extensive research during the mid-2010s into the creation of novel ionizable cationic lipids appropriate for mRNA. As of late 2020, several mRNA vaccines for SARS-CoV-2 use LNPs as their drug delivery system, including both the Moderna COVID-19 vaccine and the Pfizer–BioNTech COVID-19 vaccines. Moderna uses its own proprietary ionizable cationic lipid called SM-102, while Pfizer and BioNTech licensed an ionizable cationic lipid called ALC-0315 from Acuitas.

=== Lymphatic absorption mechanism ===
Elucidation of intestinal lymphatic absorption mechanism from solid lipid nanoparticles using Caco-2 cell line as in vitro model was developed. Several researchers have shown the enhancement of oral bioavailibility of poorly water-soluble drugs when encapsulated in solid lipid nanoparticle. This enhanced bioavailibility is achieved via lymphatic delivery. To elucidate the absorption mechanism, from solid lipid nanoparticle, human excised Caco-2 cell monolayer could be alternative tissue for development of an in-vitro model to be used as a screening tool before animal studies are undertaken. The results obtained in this model suggested that the main absorption mechanism of carvedilol loaded solid lipid nanoparticle could be endocytosis and, more specifically, clathrin-mediated endocytosis.

== See also ==
- Nanomedicine, the general field
- Micelle, lipid cored
- Liposome, lipid bilayer shell, an earlier form with some limitations
- Lipoplex, a complex of plasmid or linear DNA and lipids
- Targeted drug delivery
- mRNA-1273, from Moderna, uses LNPs
- BNT162b2, from BioNTech/Pfizer, uses LNPs
