= Nanoparticle drug delivery =

Technologies for targeted drug delivery

Nanoparticle drug delivery systems are engineered technologies that use nanoparticles for the targeted delivery and controlled release of therapeutic agents. The modern form of a drug delivery system should minimize side-effects and reduce both dosage and dosage frequency. Recently, nanoparticles have aroused attention due to their potential application for effective drug delivery.

Nanomaterials exhibit different chemical and physical properties or biological effects compared to larger-scale counterparts that can be beneficial for drug delivery systems. Some important advantages of nanoparticles are their high surface-area-to-volume ratio, chemical and geometric tunability, and their ability to interact with biomolecules to facilitate uptake across the cell membrane. The large surface area also has a large affinity for drugs and small molecules, like ligands or antibodies, for targeting and controlled release purposes.

Nanoparticles refer to a large family of materials both organic and inorganic. Each material has uniquely tunable properties and thus can be selectively designed for specific applications. Despite the many advantages of nanoparticles, there are also many challenges, including but not exclusive to: nanotoxicity, biodistribution and accumulation, and the clearance of nanoparticles by human body.

The National Institute of Biomedical Imaging and Bioengineering has issued the following prospects for future research in nanoparticle drug delivery systems:

1. crossing the blood-brain barrier (BBB) in brain diseases and disorders;
2. enhancing targeted intracellular delivery to ensure the treatments reach the correct structures inside cells;
3. combining diagnosis and treatment.

The development of new drug systems is time-consuming; it takes approximately seven years to complete fundamental research and development before advancing to preclinical animal studies.

== Characterization ==
Nanoparticle drug delivery focuses on maximizing drug efficacy and minimizing cytotoxicity. Fine-tuning nanoparticle properties for effective drug delivery involves addressing the following factors. The surface-area-to-volume ratio of nanoparticles can be altered to allow for more ligand binding to the surface. Increasing ligand binding efficiency can decrease dosage and minimize nanoparticle toxicity. Minimizing dosage or dosage frequency also lowers the mass of nanoparticle per mass of drug, thus achieving greater efficiency.

Surface functionalization of nanoparticles is another important design aspect and is often accomplished by bioconjugation or passive adsorption of molecules onto the nanoparticle surface. By functionalizing nanoparticle surfaces with ligands that enhance drug binding, suppress immune response, or provide targeting/controlled release capabilities, both a greater efficacy and lower toxicity are achieved. Efficacy is increased as more drug is delivered to the target site, and toxic side effects are lowered by minimizing the total level of drug in the body.

The composition of the nanoparticle can be chosen according to the target environment or desired effect. For example, liposome-based nanoparticles can be biologically degraded after delivery, thus minimizing the risk of accumulation and toxicity after the therapeutic cargo has been released.

Metal nanoparticles, such as gold nanoparticles, have optical qualities(also described in nanomaterials) that allow for less invasive imaging techniques. Furthermore, the photothermal response of nanoparticles to optical stimulation can be directly utilized for tumor therapy.

== Platforms ==
Current nanoparticle drug delivery systems can be cataloged based on their platform composition into several groups: polymeric nanoparticles, inorganic nanoparticles, viral nanoparticles, lipid-based nanoparticles, and nanoparticle albumin-bound (nab) technology. Each family has its unique characteristics.

=== Polymeric nanoparticles ===
Polymeric nanoparticles are synthetic polymers with a size ranging from 10 to 100 nm. Common synthetic polymeric nanoparticles include polyacrylamide, polyacrylate, and chitosan. Drug molecules can be incorporated either during or after polymerization. Depending on the polymerization chemistry, the drug can be covalently bonded, encapsulated in a hydrophobic core, or conjugated electrostatically. Common synthetic strategies for polymeric nanoparticles include microfluidic approaches, electrodropping, high pressure homogenization, and emulsion-based interfacial polymerization. Polymer biodegradability is an important aspect to consider when choosing the appropriate nanoparticle chemistry. Nanocarriers composed of biodegradable polymers undergo hydrolysis in the body, producing biocompatible small molecules such as lactic acid and glycolic acid. Polymeric nanoparticles can be created via self assembly or other methods such as particle replication in nonwetting templates (PRINT) which allows customization of composition, size, and shape of the nanoparticle using tiny molds.

=== Dendrimers ===
Dendrimers are unique hyper-branched synthetic polymers with monodispersed size, well-defined structure, and a highly functionalized terminal surface. They are typically composed of synthetic or natural amino acid, nucleic acids, and carbohydrates. Therapeutics can be loaded with relative ease onto the interior of the dendrimers or the terminal surface of the branches via electrostatic interaction, hydrophobic interactions, hydrogen bonds, chemical linkages, or covalent conjugation. Drug-dendrimer conjugation can elongate the half-life of drugs. Currently, dendrimer use in biological systems is limited due to dendrimer toxicity and limitations in their synthesis methods. Dendrimers are also confined within a narrow size range (<15 nm) and current synthesis methods are subject to low yield. The surface groups will reach the de Gennes dense packing limit at high generation level, which seals the interior from the bulk solution – this can be useful for encapsulation of hydrophobic, poorly soluble drug molecules. The seal can be tuned by intramolecular interactions between adjacent surface groups, which can be varied by the condition of the solution, such as pH, polarity, and temperature, a property which can be utilized to tailor encapsulation and controlled release properties.

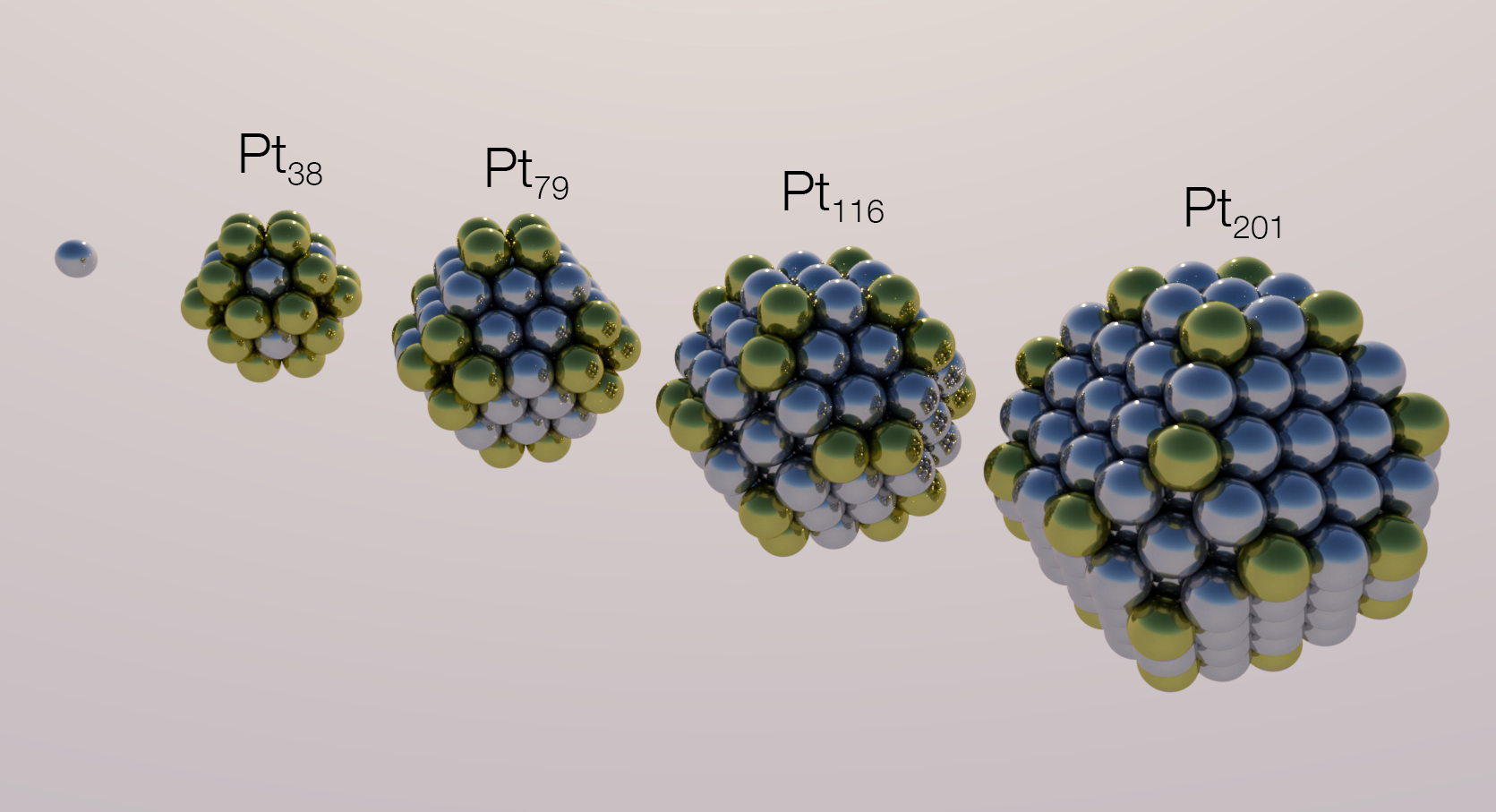
Platinum nanoparticles

=== Inorganic Nanoparticles and Nanocrystals ===
Inorganic nanoparticles have emerged as highly valuable functional building blocks for drug delivery systems due to their well-defined and highly tunable properties such as size, shape, and surface functionalization. Inorganic nanoparticles have been largely adopted to biological and medical applications ranging from imaging and diagnoses to drug delivery. Inorganic nanoparticles are usually composed of inert metals such as gold and titanium that form nanospheres, however, iron oxide nanoparticles have also become an option.

Quantum dots (QDs), or inorganic semiconductor nanocrystals, have also emerged as valuable tools in the field of bionanotechnology because of their unique size-dependent optical properties and versatile surface chemistry. Their diameters (2 - 10 nm) are on the order of the exciton Bohr radius, resulting in quantum confinement effects analogous to the "particle-in-a-box" model. As a result, optical and electronic properties of quantum dots vary with their size: nanocrystals of larger sizes will emit lower energy light upon fluorescence excitation.

Surface engineering of QDs is crucial for creating nanoparticle–biomolecule hybrids capable of participating in biological processes. Manipulation of nanocrystal core composition, size, and structure changes QD photo-physical properties Designing coating materials which encapsulate the QD core in an organic shell make nanocrystals biocompatible, and QDs can be further decorated with biomolecules to enable more specific interaction with biological targets. The design of inorganic nanocrystal core coupled with biologically compatible organic shell and surface ligands can combine useful properties of both materials, i.e. optical properties of the QDs and biological functions of ligands attached.

==== Toxicity ====
While application of inorganic nanoparticles in bionanotechnology shows encouraging advancements from a materials science perspective, the use of such materials in vivo is limited by issues related with toxicity, biodistribution and bioaccumulation. Because metal inorganic nanoparticle systems degrade into their constituent metal atoms, challenges may arise from the interactions of these materials with biosystems, and a considerable amount of the particles may remain in the body after treatment, leading to a buildup of metal particles potentially resulting in toxicity.

Recently, however, some studies have shown that certain nanoparticle environmental toxicity effects aren't apparent until nanoparticles undergo transformations to release free metal ions. Under aerobic and anaerobic conditions, it was found that copper, silver, and titanium nanoparticles released low or insignificant levels of metal ions. This is evidence that copper, silver, and titanium NP are slow to release metal ions, and may therefore appear at low levels in the environment. Additionally, nanoshell coatings significantly protect against degradation in the cellular environment and also reduce QDs toxicity by reducing metal ion leakage from the core.

=== Organic Nanocrystals ===
Organic nanocrystals consist of pure drugs and surface active agents required for stabilization. They are defined as carrier-free submicron colloidal drug delivery systems with a mean particle size in the nanometer range. The primary importance of the formulation of drugs into nanocrystals is the increase in particle surface area in contact with the dissolution medium, therefore increasing bioavailability. A number of drug products formulated in this way are on the market.

==== Solubility ====
One of the issues faced by drug delivery is the solubility of the drug in the body; around 40% of newly detected chemicals found in drug discovery are poorly soluble in water. This low solubility affects the bioavailability of the drug, meaning the rate at which the drug reaches the circulatory system and thus the target site. Low bioavailability is most commonly seen in oral administration, which is the preferred choice for drug administration due to its convenience, low costs, and good patient practice. A measure to improve poor bioavailability is to inject the drugs in a solvent mixture with a solubilizing agent. However, results show this solution is ineffective, with the solubilizing agent demonstrating side-effects and/or toxicity. Nanocrystals used for drug delivery can increase saturation solubility and dispersion velocity. Generally, saturation solubility is thought to be a function of temperature, but it is also based on other factors, such as crystalline structure and particle size, in regards to nanocrystals. The Ostwald-Freundlich equation below shows this relationship:

$log (\frac{C_s}{C_{\alpha}}) = \frac{2\sigma V}{2.303RT\rho r}$

Where C_{s} is the saturation solubility of the nanocrystal, C_{𝛼} is the solubility of the drug at a non-nano scale, σ is the interfacial tension of the substance, V is the molar volume of the particle, R is the gas constant, T is the absolute temperature, 𝜌 is the density of the solid, and r is the radius. The advantage of nanocrystals is that they can improve oral adsorption, bioavailability, action onset and reduces intersubject variability. Consequently, nanocrystals are now being produced and are on the market for a variety of purposes ranging from antidepressants to appetite stimulants. Nanocrystals can be produced using two different ways: the top-down method or the bottom-up method. Bottom-up technologies are also known as nanoprecipitation. This technique involves dissolving a drug in a suitable solvent and then precipitating it with a non-solvent. On the other hand, top-down technologies use force to reduce the size of a particle to nanometers, usually done by milling a drug. Top-down methods are preferred when working with poorly soluble drugs.

==== Stability ====
A disadvantage of using nanocrystals for drug delivery is nanocrystal stability. Instability problems of nanocrystalline structures derive from thermodynamic processes such as particle aggregation, amorphization, and bulk crystallization. Particles at the nanoscopic scale feature a relative excess of Gibbs free energy, due to their higher surface area to volume ratio. To reduce this excess energy, it is generally favorable for aggregation to occur. Thus, individual nanocrystals are relatively unstable by themselves and will generally aggregate. This is particularly problematic in top-down production of nanocrystals. Methods such as high-pressure homogenization and bead milling, tend to increase instabilities by increasing surface areas; to compensate, or as a response to high pressure, individual particles may aggregate or turn amorphous in structure. Such methods can also lead to the reprecipitation of the drug by surpassing the solubility beyond the saturation point (Ostwald ripening). One method to overcome aggregation and retain or increase nanocrystal stability is by use of stabilizer molecules. These molecules, which interact with the surface of the nanocrystals and prevent aggregation via ionic repulsion or steric barriers between the individual nanocrystals, include surfactants and are generally useful for stabilizing suspensions of nanocrystals. Concentrations of surfactants that are too high, however, may inhibit nanocrystal stability and enhance crystal growth or aggregation. It has been shown that certain surfactants, upon reaching a critical concentration, begin to self-assemble into micelles, which then compete with nanocrystal surfaces for other surfactant molecules. With fewer surface molecules interacting with the nanocrystal surface, crystal growth and aggregation is reported to occur at increased amounts. Use of surfactant at optimal concentrations reportedly allows for higher stability, larger drug capacity as a carrier, and sustained drug release. In a study using PEG as a stabilizer was found that nanocrystals treated with PEG enhanced accumulation at tumor sites and had greater blood circulation, than those not treated with PEG. Amorphization can occur in top-down methods of production. With different intramolecular arrangements, amorphization of nanocrystals leads to different thermodynamic and kinetic properties that affect drug delivery and kinetics. Transition to amorphous structures is reported to occur through production practices such as spray drying, lyophilization, and mechanical mechanisms, such as milling. This amorphization has been reportedly observed with or without the presence of stabilizer in a dry milling process. Using a wet milling process with surfactant, however significantly reduced amorphization, suggesting that solvent, in this case water, and surfactant could inhibit amorphization for some top-down production methods that otherwise reportedly facilitate amorphization.

=== Liposome delivery ===
Basic liposome structure

Liposomes are spherical vesicles composed of synthetic or natural phospholipids that self-assemble in aqueous solution in sizes ranging from tens of nanometers to micrometers. The resulting vesicle, which has an aqueous core surrounded by a hydrophobic membrane, can be loaded with a wide variety of hydrophobic or hydrophilic molecules for therapeutic purposes.

Liposomes are typically synthesized with naturally occurring phospholipids, mainly phosphatidylcholine. Cholesterol is often included in the formulation to adjust the rigidity of the membrane and to increase stability. The molecular cargo is loaded through liposome formation in aqueous solution, solvent exchange mechanisms, or pH gradients methods. Various molecules can also be chemically conjugated to the surface of the liposome to alter recognition properties. One typical modification is conjugating polyethyleneglycol (PEG) to the vesicle surface. The hydrophilic polymer prevents recognition by macrophages and decreases clearance. The size, surface charge, and bilayer fluidity also alter liposome delivery kinetics. Liposomes diffuse from the bloodstream into the interstitial space near the target site. As the cell membrane itself is composed of phospholipids, liposomes can directly fuse with the membrane and release the cargo into the cytosol, or may enter the cell through phagocytosis or other active transport pathways. Liposomal delivery has various advantages. Liposomes increase the solubility, stability, and uptake of drug molecules. Peptides, polymers, and other molecules can be conjugated to the surface of a liposome for targeted delivery. Conjugating various ligands can facilitate binding to target cells based on the receptor-ligand interaction. Altering vesicle size and surface chemistry can also be tuned to increase circulation time. Various FDA-approved liposomal drugs are in clinical use in the US. The anthracycline drug doxorubicin is delivered with phospholipid-cholesterol liposomes to treat AIDS-related Kaposi sarcoma and multiple myeloma with high efficacy and low toxicity. Many others are undergoing clinical trials, and liposomal drug delivery remains an active field of research today, with potential applications including nucleic acid therapy, brain targeting, and tumor therapy.

=== Viral vectors, viral-like particles, and biological nanocarriers ===
Viruses can be used to deliver genes for genetic engineering or gene therapy. Commonly used viruses include adenoviruses, retroviruses, and various bacteriophages. The surface of the viral particle can also be modified with ligands to increase targeting capabilities. While viral vectors can be used to great efficacy, one concern is that may cause off-target effects due to its natural tropism. This usually requires replacing the proteins causing virus-cell interactions with chimeric proteins. In addition to using viruses, drug molecules can also be encapsulated in protein particles derived from the viral capsid, or virus-like particles (VLPs). VLPs are easier to manufacture than viruses, and their structural uniformity allows VLPs to be produced precisely in large amounts. VLPs also have easy-to-modify surfaces, allowing the possibility for targeted delivery. There are various methods of packaging the molecule into the capsid; most take advantage of the capsid's ability to self-assemble. One strategy is to alter the pH gradient outside the capsid to create pores on the capsid surface and trap the desired molecule. Other methods use aggregators such as leucine zippers or polymer-DNA amphiphiles to induce capsid formation and capture drug molecules. It is also possible to chemically conjugate of drugs directly onto the reactive sites on the capsid surface, often involving the formation of amide bonds. After being introduced to the organism, VLPs often have broad tissue distribution, rapid clearance, and are generally non-toxic. It may, however, like viruses, invoke an immune response, so immune-masking agents may be necessary.

=== Nanoparticle Albumin-bound (nab) Technology ===
Nanoparticle albumin-bound technology utilizes the protein albumin as a carrier for hydrophobic chemotherapy drugs through noncovalent binding. Because albumin is already a natural carrier of hydrophobic particles and is able to transcytose molecules bound to itself, albumin composed nanoparticles have become an effective strategy for the treatment of many diseases in clinical research.

== Delivery and release mechanisms ==
An ideal drug delivery system should have effective targeting and controlled release. The two main targeting strategies are passive targeting and active targeting. Passive targeting depends on the fact that tumors have abnormally structured blood vessels that favor accumulation of relatively large macromolecules and nanoparticles. This so-called enhanced permeability and retention effect (EPR) allows the drug-carrier be transported specifically to the tumor cells. Active targeting is, as the name suggests, much more specific and is achieved by taking advantage of receptor-ligand interactions at the surface of the cell membrane. Controlled drug release systems can be achieved through several methods. Rate-programmed drug delivery systems are tuned to the diffusivity of active agents across the membrane. Another delivery-release mechanism is activation-modulated drug delivery, where the release is triggered by environmental stimuli. The stimuli can be external, such as the introduction of a chemical activators or activation by light or electromagnetic fields, or biological - such as pH, temperature, and osmotic pressure which can vary widely throughout the body.

=== Polymeric nanoparticles ===
For polymeric nanoparticles, the induction of stimuli-responsiveness has usually relied heavily upon well-known polymers that possess an inherent stimuli-responsiveness. Certain polymers that can undergo reversible phase transitions due to changes in temperature or pH have aroused interest. Arguably the most utilized polymer for activation-modulated delivery is the thermo-responsive polymer poly(N-isopropylacrylamide). It is readily soluble in water at room temperature but precipitates reversibly from when the temperature is raised above its lower critical solution temperature (LCST), changing from an extended chain conformation to a collapsed chain. This feature presents a way to change the hydrophilicity of a polymer via temperature. Efforts also focus on dual stimuli-responsive drug delivery systems, which can be harnessed to control the release of the encapsulated drug. For example, the triblock copolymer of poly(ethylene glycol)-b-poly(3-aminopropyl-methacrylamide)-b-poly(N-isopropylacrylamide) (PEG-b-PAPMA-b-PNIPAm) can self-assemble to form micelles, possessing a core–shell–corona architecture above the lower critical solution temperature. It is also pH responsive. Therefore, drug release can be tuned by changing either temperature or pH conditions.

=== Inorganic nanoparticles ===
Drug delivery strategies of inorganic nanoparticles are dependent on material properties. The active targeting of inorganic nanoparticle drug carriers is often achieved by surface functionalization with specific ligands of nanoparticles. For example, the inorganic multifunctional nanovehicle (5-FU/Fe_{3}O_{4}/αZrP@CHI-FA-R6G) is able to accomplish tumor optical imaging and therapy simultaneously. It can be directed to the location of cancer cells with sustained release behavior. Studies have also been done on gold nanoparticle responses to local near-infrared (NIR) light as a stimuli for drug release. In one study, gold nanoparticles functionalized with double-stranded DNA encapsulated with drug molecules, were irradiated with NIR light. The particles generated heat and denatured the double-stranded DNA, which triggered the release of drugs at the target site. Studies also suggest that a porous structure is beneficial to attain a sustained or pulsatile release. Porous inorganic materials demonstrate high mechanical and chemical stability within a range of physiological conditions. The well-defined surface properties, such as high pore volume, narrow pore diameter distribution, and high surface area allow the entrapment of drugs, proteins and other biogenic molecules with predictable and reproducible release patterns.

== Toxicity ==
Some of the same properties that make nanoparticles efficient drug carriers also contribute to their toxicity. For example, gold nanoparticles are known to interact with proteins through surface adsorption, forming a protein corona, which can be utilized for cargo loading and immune shielding. However, this protein-adsorption property can also disrupt normal protein function that is essential for homeostasis, especially when the protein contains exposed sulfur groups. The photothermal effect, which can be induced to kill tumor cells, may also create reactive oxygen species that impose oxidative stress on surrounding healthy cells. Gold nanoparticles of sizes below 4-5 nm fit in DNA grooves which can interfere with transcription, gene regulation, replication, and other processes that rely on DNA-protein binding. Lack of biodegradability for some nanoparticle chemistries can lead to accumulation in certain tissues, thus interfering with a wide range of biological processes. Currently, there is no regulatory framework in the United States for testing nanoparticles for their general impact on health and on the environment.
