= Vectors in gene therapy =

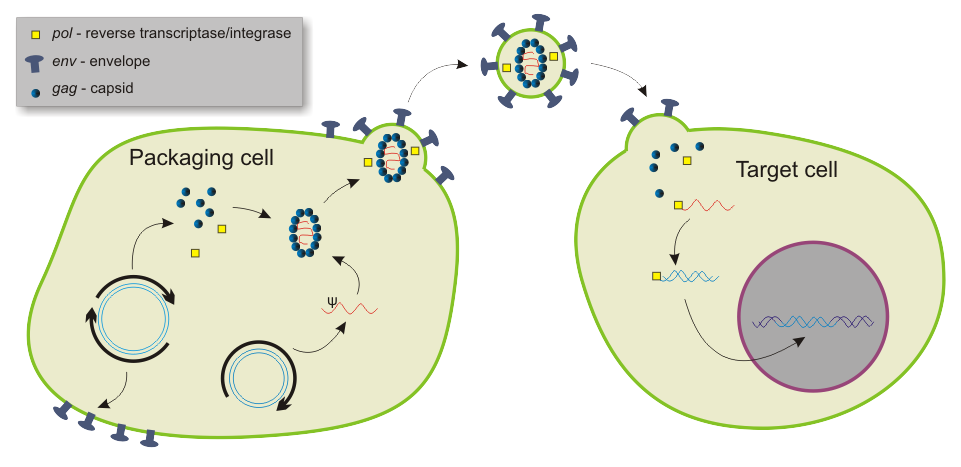
How vectors work to transfer genetic material

Gene therapy utilizes the delivery of DNA into cells, which can be accomplished by several methods, summarized below. The two major classes of methods are those that use recombinant viruses (sometimes called biological nanoparticles or viral vectors) and those that use naked DNA or DNA complexes (non-viral methods).

== Viruses ==
All viruses bind to their hosts and introduce their genetic material into the host cell as part of their replication cycle. This genetic material contains basic 'instructions' of how to produce more copies of these viruses, hacking the body's normal production machinery to serve the needs of the virus. The host cell will carry out these instructions and produce additional copies of the virus, leading to more and more cells becoming infected. Some types of viruses insert their genome into the host's cytoplasm, but do not actually enter the cell. Others penetrate the cell membrane disguised as protein molecules and enter the cell.

There are two main types of virus infection: lytic and lysogenic. Shortly after inserting its DNA, viruses of the lytic cycle quickly produce more viruses, burst from the cell and infect more cells. Lysogenic viruses integrate their DNA into the DNA of the host cell and may live in the body for many years before responding to a trigger. The virus reproduces as the cell does and does not inflict bodily harm until it is triggered. The trigger releases the DNA from that of the host and employs it to create new viruses.

=== Retroviruses ===
The genetic material in retroviruses is in the form of RNA molecules, while the genetic material of their hosts is in the form of DNA. When a retrovirus infects a host cell, it will introduce its RNA together with some enzymes, namely reverse transcriptase and integrase, into the cell. This RNA molecule from the retrovirus must produce a DNA copy from its RNA molecule before it can be integrated into the genetic material of the host cell. The process of producing a DNA copy from an RNA molecule is termed reverse transcription. It is carried out by one of the enzymes carried in the virus, called reverse transcriptase. After this DNA copy is produced and is free in the nucleus of the host cell, it must be incorporated into the genome of the host cell. That is, it must be inserted into the large DNA molecules in the cell (the chromosomes). This process is done by another enzyme carried in the virus called integrase.

Now that the genetic material of the virus has been inserted, it can be said that the host cell has been modified to contain new genes. If this host cell divides later, its descendants will all contain the new genes. Sometimes the genes of the retrovirus do not express their information immediately.

One of the problems of gene therapy using retroviruses is that the integrase enzyme can insert the genetic material of the virus into any arbitrary position in the genome of the host; it randomly inserts the genetic material into a chromosome. If genetic material happens to be inserted in the middle of one of the original genes of the host cell, this gene will be disrupted (insertional mutagenesis). If the gene happens to be one regulating cell division, uncontrolled cell division (i.e., cancer) can occur. This problem has recently begun to be addressed by utilizing zinc finger nucleases or by including certain sequences such as the beta-globin locus control region to direct the site of integration to specific chromosomal sites.

Gene therapy trials using retroviral vectors to treat X-linked severe combined immunodeficiency (X-SCID) represent the most successful application of gene therapy to date. More than twenty patients have been treated in France and Britain, with a high rate of immune system reconstitution observed. Similar trials were restricted or halted in the US when leukemia was reported in patients treated in the French X-SCID gene therapy trial. To date, four children in the French trial and one in the British trial have developed leukemia as a result of insertional mutagenesis by the retroviral vector. All but one of these children responded well to conventional anti-leukemia treatment. Gene therapy trials to treat SCID due to deficiency of the Adenosine Deaminase (ADA) enzyme (one form of SCID) continue with relative success in the US, Britain, Ireland, Italy and Japan.

=== Adenoviruses ===
Adenoviruses are viruses that carry their genetic material in the form of double-stranded DNA. They cause respiratory, intestinal, and eye infections in humans (especially the common cold). When these viruses infect a host cell, they introduce their DNA molecule into the host. The genetic material of the adenoviruses is not incorporated (transient) into the host cell's genetic material. The DNA molecule is left free in the nucleus of the host cell, and the instructions in this extra DNA molecule are transcribed just like any other gene. The only difference is that these extra genes are not replicated when the cell is about to undergo cell division so the descendants of that cell will not have the extra gene.

As a result, treatment with the adenovirus will require re-administration in a growing cell population although the absence of integration into the host cell's genome should prevent the type of cancer seen in the SCID trials. This vector system has been promoted for treating cancer and indeed the first gene therapy product to be licensed to treat cancer, Gendicine, is an adenovirus. Gendicine, an adenoviral p53-based gene therapy was approved by the Chinese food and drug regulators in 2003 for treatment of head and neck cancer. Advexin, a similar gene therapy approach from Introgen, was turned down by the US Food and Drug Administration (FDA) in 2008.

Concerns about the safety of adenovirus vectors were raised after the 1999 death of Jesse Gelsinger while participating in a gene therapy trial. Since then, work using adenovirus vectors has focused on genetically limited versions of the virus.

=== Cytomegalovirus ===
Cytomegalovirus (CMV) is part of the β-herpesvirus subfamily that includes roseoloviruses. CMV coevolved with an assortment of mammalian hosts, including human CMV (HCMV), murine CMV (MCMV) and rhesus CMV (RhCMV). CMVs are characterized by large DNA genomes and typically asymptomatic infection in healthy hosts.

The first investigation into cytomegalovirus (CMV) as a gene therapy vector was published in 2000. CMV's tropism for hematopoietic progenitor cells and its large genome (230 kbp) initially attracted researchers. CMV-based vaccine vectors have since been used to induce T Cell response. More recently, CMV containing telomerase and follistatin was intravenously and intranasally delivered in mouse studies with the intention of extending healthspan.

=== Envelope protein pseudotyping of viral vectors ===
The viral vectors described above have natural host cell populations that they infect most efficiently. Retroviruses have limited natural host cell ranges, and although adenovirus and adeno-associated virus are able to infect a relatively broader range of cells efficiently, some cell types are resistant to infection by these viruses as well. Attachment to and entry into a susceptible cell is mediated by the protein envelope on the surface of a virus. Retroviruses and adeno-associated viruses have a single protein coating their membrane, while adenoviruses are coated with both an envelope protein and fibers that extend away from the surface of the virus. The envelope proteins on each of these viruses bind to cell-surface molecules such as heparin sulfate, which localizes them upon the surface of the potential host, as well as with the specific protein receptor that either induces entry-promoting structural changes in the viral protein, or localizes the virus in endosomes wherein acidification of the lumen induces this refolding of the viral coat. In either case, entry into potential host cells requires a favorable interaction between a protein on the surface of the virus and a protein on the surface of the cell.

For the purposes of gene therapy, one might either want to limit or expand the range of cells susceptible to transduction by a gene therapy vector. To this end, many vectors have been developed in which the endogenous viral envelope proteins have been replaced by either envelope proteins from other viruses, or by chimeric proteins. Such chimera would consist of those parts of the viral protein necessary for incorporation into the virion as well as sequences meant to interact with specific host cell proteins. Viruses in which the envelope proteins have been replaced as described are referred to as pseudotyped viruses. For example, the most popular retroviral vector for use in gene therapy trials has been the lentivirus Simian immunodeficiency virus coated with the envelope proteins, G-protein, from Vesicular stomatitis virus. This vector is referred to as VSV G-pseudotyped lentivirus, and infects an almost universal set of cells. This tropism is characteristic of the VSV G-protein with which this vector is coated. Many attempts have been made to limit the tropism of viral vectors to one or a few host cell populations. This advance would allow for the systemic administration of a relatively small amount of vector. The potential for off-target cell modification would be limited, and many concerns from the medical community would be alleviated. Most attempts to limit tropism have used chimeric envelope proteins bearing antibody fragments. These vectors show great promise for the development of "magic bullet" gene therapies.

=== Replication-competent vectors ===
A replication-competent vector called ONYX-015 is used in replicating tumor cells. It was found that in the absence of the E1B-55Kd viral protein, adenovirus caused very rapid apoptosis of infected, p53(+) cells, and this results in dramatically reduced virus progeny and no subsequent spread. Apoptosis was mainly the result of the ability of EIA to inactivate p300. In p53(-) cells, deletion of E1B 55kd has no consequence in terms of apoptosis, and viral replication is similar to that of wild-type virus, resulting in massive killing of cells.

A replication-defective vector deletes some essential genes. These deleted genes are still necessary in the body so they are replaced with either a helper virus or a DNA molecule.

=== Cis and trans-acting elements ===
Replication-defective vectors always contain a "transfer construct". The transfer construct carries the gene to be transduced or "transgene". The transfer construct also carries the sequences which are necessary for the general functioning of the viral genome: packaging sequence, repeats for replication and, when needed, priming of reverse transcription. These are denominated cis-acting elements, because they need to be on the same piece of DNA as the viral genome and the gene of interest. Trans-acting elements are viral elements, which can be encoded on a different DNA molecule. For example, the viral structural proteins can be expressed from a different genetic element than the viral genome.

=== Herpes simplex virus ===
The herpes simplex virus is a human neurotropic virus. This is mostly examined for gene transfer in the nervous system. The wild type HSV-1 virus is able to infect neurons and evade the host immune response, but may still become reactivated and produce a lytic cycle of viral replication. Therefore, it is typical to use mutant strains of HSV-1 that are deficient in their ability to replicate. Though the latent virus is not transcriptionally apparent, it does possess neuron specific promoters that can continue to function normally. Antibodies to HSV-1 are common in humans, however complications due to herpes infection are somewhat rare. Caution for rare cases of encephalitis must be taken and this provides some rationale to using HSV-2 as a viral vector as it generally has tropism for neuronal cells innervating the urogenital area of the body and could then spare the host of severe pathology in the brain.

== Non-viral methods ==
Non-viral methods present certain advantages over viral methods, with simple large scale production and low host immunogenicity being just two. Previously, low levels of transfection and expression of the gene held non-viral methods at a disadvantage; however, recent advances in vector technology have yielded molecules and techniques with transfection efficiencies similar to those of viruses.

=== Injection of naked DNA ===
This is the simplest method of non-viral transfection. Clinical trials carried out of intramuscular injection of a naked DNA plasmid have occurred with some success; however, the expression has been very low in comparison to other methods of transfection. In addition to trials with plasmids, there have been trials with naked PCR product, which have had similar or greater success. Cellular uptake of naked DNA is generally inefficient. Research efforts focusing on improving the efficiency of naked DNA uptake have yielded several novel methods, such as electroporation, sonoporation, and the use of a "gene gun", which shoots DNA coated gold particles into the cell using high pressure gas.

=== Physical methods to enhance delivery ===
==== Electroporation ====
Electroporation is a method that uses short pulses of high voltage to carry DNA across the cell membrane. This shock is thought to cause temporary formation of pores in the cell membrane, allowing DNA molecules to pass through. Electroporation is generally efficient and works across a broad range of cell types. However, a high rate of cell death following electroporation has limited its use, including clinical applications.

More recently a newer method of electroporation, termed electron-avalanche transfection, has been used in gene therapy experiments. By using a high-voltage plasma discharge, DNA was efficiently delivered following very short (microsecond) pulses. Compared to electroporation, the technique resulted in greatly increased efficiency and less cellular damage.

==== Gene gun ====
The use of particle bombardment, or the gene gun, is another physical method of DNA transfection. In this technique, DNA is coated onto gold particles and loaded into a device which generates a force to achieve penetration of the DNA into the cells, leaving the gold behind on a "stopping" disk.

==== Sonoporation ====
Sonoporation uses ultrasonic frequencies to deliver DNA into cells. The process of acoustic cavitation is thought to disrupt the cell membrane and allow DNA to move into cells.

==== Magnetofection ====
In a method termed magnetofection, DNA is complexed to magnetic particles, and a magnet is placed underneath the tissue culture dish to bring DNA complexes into contact with a cell monolayer.

==== Hydrodynamic delivery ====
Hydrodynamic delivery involves rapid injection of a high volume of a solution into vasculature (such as into the inferior vena cava, bile duct, or tail vein). The solution contains molecules that are to be inserted into cells, such as DNA plasmids or siRNA, and transfer of these molecules into cells is assisted by the elevated hydrostatic pressure caused by the high volume of injected solution.

=== Chemical methods to enhance delivery ===
==== Oligonucleotides ====
The use of synthetic oligonucleotides in gene therapy is to deactivate the genes involved in the disease process. There are several methods by which this is achieved. One strategy uses antisense specific to the target gene to disrupt the transcription of the faulty gene. Another uses small molecules of RNA called siRNA to signal the cell to cleave specific unique sequences in the mRNA transcript of the faulty gene, disrupting translation of the faulty mRNA, and therefore expression of the gene. A further strategy uses double stranded oligodeoxynucleotides as a decoy for the transcription factors that are required to activate the transcription of the target gene. The transcription factors bind to the decoys instead of the promoter of the faulty gene, which reduces the transcription of the target gene, lowering expression. Additionally, single stranded DNA oligonucleotides have been used to direct a single base change within a mutant gene. The oligonucleotide is designed to anneal with complementarity to the target gene with the exception of a central base, the target base, which serves as the template base for repair. This technique is referred to as oligonucleotide mediated gene repair, targeted gene repair, or targeted nucleotide alteration.

==== Lipoplexes ====
To improve the delivery of the new DNA into the cell, the DNA must be protected from damage and positively charged. Initially, anionic and neutral lipids were used for the construction of lipoplexes for synthetic vectors. However, in spite of the facts that there is little toxicity associated with them, that they are compatible with body fluids and that there was a possibility of adapting them to be tissue specific; they are complicated and time-consuming to produce so attention was turned to the cationic versions.

Cationic lipids, due to their positive charge, were first used to condense negatively charged DNA molecules so as to facilitate the encapsulation of DNA into liposomes. Later it was found that the use of cationic lipids significantly enhanced the stability of lipoplexes. Also as a result of their charge, cationic liposomes interact with the cell membrane, endocytosis was widely believed as the major route by which cells uptake lipoplexes. Endosomes are formed as the results of endocytosis, however, if genes can not be released into cytoplasm by breaking the membrane of endosome, they will be sent to lysosomes where all DNA will be destroyed before they could achieve their functions. It was also found that although cationic lipids themselves could condense and encapsulate DNA into liposomes, the transfection efficiency is very low due to the lack of ability in terms of "endosomal escaping". However, when helper lipids (usually electroneutral lipids, such as DOPE) were added to form lipoplexes, much higher transfection efficiency was observed. Later on, it was discovered that certain lipids have the ability to destabilize endosomal membranes so as to facilitate the escape of DNA from endosome, therefore those lipids are called fusogenic lipids. Although cationic liposomes have been widely used as an alternative for gene delivery vectors, a dose dependent toxicity of cationic lipids were also observed which could limit their therapeutic usages.

The most common use of lipoplexes has been in gene transfer into cancer cells, where the supplied genes have activated tumor suppressor control genes in the cell and decrease the activity of oncogenes. Recent studies have shown lipoplexes to be useful in transfecting respiratory epithelial cells.

==== Polymersomes ====
Polymersomes are synthetic versions of liposomes (vesicles with a lipid bilayer), made of amphiphilic block copolymers. They can encapsulate either hydrophilic or hydrophobic contents and can be used to deliver cargo such as DNA, proteins, or drugs to cells. Advantages of polymersomes over liposomes include greater stability, mechanical strength, blood circulation time, and storage capacity.

==== Polyplexes ====
Complexes of polymers with DNA are called polyplexes. Most polyplexes consist of cationic polymers and their fabrication is based on self-assembly by ionic interactions. One important difference between the methods of action of polyplexes and lipoplexes is that polyplexes cannot directly release their DNA load into the cytoplasm. As a result, co-transfection with endosome-lytic agents such as inactivated adenovirus was required to facilitate nanoparticle escape from the endocytic vesicle made during particle uptake. However, a better understanding of the mechanisms by which DNA can escape from endolysosomal pathway, i.e. proton sponge effect, has triggered new polymer synthesis strategies such as incorporation of protonable residues in polymer backbone and has revitalized research on polycation-based systems.

Due to their low toxicity, high loading capacity, and ease of fabrication, polycationic nanocarriers demonstrate great promise compared to their rivals such as viral vectors which show high immunogenicity and potential carcinogenicity, and lipid-based vectors which cause dose dependence toxicity. Polyethyleneimine and chitosan are among the polymeric carriers that have been extensively studied for development of gene delivery therapeutics. Other polycationic carriers such as poly(beta-amino esters) and polyphosphoramidate are being added to the library of potential gene carriers. In addition to the variety of polymers and copolymers, the ease of controlling the size, shape, surface chemistry of these polymeric nano-carriers gives them an edge in targeting capability and taking advantage of enhanced permeability and retention effect.

==== Dendrimers ====
A dendrimer is a highly branched macromolecule with a spherical shape. The surface of the particle may be functionalized in many ways and many of the properties of the resulting construct are determined by its surface.

In particular it is possible to construct a cationic dendrimer, i.e. one with a positive surface charge. When in the presence of genetic material such as DNA or RNA, charge complementarity leads to a temporary association of the nucleic acid with the cationic dendrimer. On reaching its destination the dendrimer-nucleic acid complex is then taken into the cell via endocytosis.

In recent years the benchmark for transfection agents has been cationic lipids. Limitations of these competing reagents have been reported to include: the lack of ability to transfect some cell types, the lack of robust active targeting capabilities, incompatibility with animal models, and toxicity. Dendrimers offer robust covalent construction and extreme control over molecule structure, and therefore size. Together these give compelling advantages compared to existing approaches.

Producing dendrimers has historically been a slow and expensive process consisting of numerous slow reactions, an obstacle that severely curtailed their commercial development. The Michigan-based company Dendritic Nanotechnologies discovered a method to produce dendrimers using kinetically driven chemistry, a process that not only reduced cost by a magnitude of three, but also cut reaction time from over a month to several days. These new "Priostar" dendrimers can be specifically constructed to carry a DNA or RNA payload that transfects cells at a high efficiency with little or no toxicity.

==== Inorganic nanoparticles ====
Inorganic nanoparticles, such as gold, silica, iron oxide (ex. magnetofection) and calcium phosphates have been shown to be capable of gene delivery. Some of the benefits of inorganic vectors is in their storage stability, low manufacturing cost and often time, low immunogenicity, and resistance to microbial attack. Nanosized materials less than 100 nm have been shown to efficiently trap the DNA or RNA and allows its escape from the endosome without degradation. Inorganics have also been shown to exhibit improved in vitro transfection for attached cell lines due to their increased density and preferential location on the base of the culture dish. Quantum dots have also been used successfully and permits the coupling of gene therapy with a stable fluorescence marker. Engineered organic nanoparticles are also under development, which could be used for co-delivery of genes and therapeutic agents.

==== Cell-penetrating peptides ====
Cell-penetrating peptides (CPPs), also known as peptide transduction domains (PTDs), are short peptides (< 40 amino acids) that efficiently pass through cell membranes while being covalently or non-covalently bound to various molecules, thus facilitating these molecules' entry into cells. Cell entry occurs primarily by endocytosis but other entry mechanisms also exist. Examples of cargo molecules of CPPs include nucleic acids, liposomes, and drugs of low molecular weight.

CPP cargo can be directed into specific cell organelles by incorporating localization sequences into CPP sequences. For example, nuclear localization sequences are commonly used to guide CPP cargo into the nucleus. For guidance into mitochondria, a mitochondrial targeting sequence can be used; this method is used in protofection (a technique that allows for foreign mitochondrial DNA to be inserted into cells' mitochondria).

== Hybrid methods ==
Due to every method of gene transfer having shortcomings, there have been some hybrid methods developed that combine two or more techniques. Virosomes are one example; they combine liposomes with an inactivated HIV or influenza virus. This has been shown to have more efficient gene transfer in respiratory epithelial cells than either viral or liposomal methods alone. Other methods involve mixing other viral vectors with cationic lipids or hybridising viruses.

== See also ==
- Genosome (lipoplex)
- Techniques of genetic engineering
- Transformation
- Transfection
- Transduction
