= Tissue nanotransfection =

Tissue nanotransfection (TNT) is an electroporation-based technique capable of gene and drug cargo delivery or transfection at the nanoscale. Furthermore, TNT is a scaffold-less tissue engineering (TE) technique that can be considered cell-only or tissue inducing depending on cellular or tissue level applications. The transfection method makes use of nanochannels to deliver cargo to tissues topically.

== History ==
Cargo delivery methods rely on carriers, for example nanoparticles, viral vectors, or physical approaches such as gene guns, microinjection, or electroporation. The various methods can be limited by size constraints or their ability to efficiently deliver cargo without damaging tissue. Electroporation is a physical method which harnesses an electric field to open pores in the normally semi-permeable cell membrane through which cargo can enter. In this process, the charges can be used to drive cargo in a specific direction.

Bulk electroporation (BEP) is the most conventional electroporation method. Benefits come in the form of high throughput and minimal set-up times. The downside of BEP is that the cell membrane experiences an uneven distribution of the electric field and many membranes receive irreversible damage from which they can no longer close, thus leading to low cell viability.

Attempts have been made to miniaturize electroporation such as microelectroporation (MEP) and nanochannel electroporation (NEP) which uses electroporation approached to deliver cargo through micro/nanochannels respectively. These techniques have shown to have higher efficiency of delivery, increased uniform transfection, and increased cell viability compared to BEP.

== Technique ==
Tissue nanotransfection uses custom fabricated nanochannel arrays for nanoscale delivery of genetic cargo directly onto the surface of the skin. The postage stamp-sized chip is placed directly on the skin and an electric current is induced lasting for milliseconds to deliver the gene cargo with precise control. This approach delivers ample amounts of reprogramming factors to single-cells, creating potential for a powerful gene transfection and reprogramming method. The delivered cargo then transforms the affected cells into a desired cell type without first transforming them to stem cells. TNT is a novel technique and has been used on mice models to successfully transfect fibroblasts into neuron-like cells along with rescue of ischemia in mice models with induced vasculature and perfusion. Current methods require the fabricated TNT chip to be placed on the skin and the loading reservoir filled with a gene solution. An electrode (cathode) is placed into the well with a counter electrode (anode) placed under the chip intradermally (into the skin). The electric field generated delivers the genes.

Initial TNT experiments showed that genes could be delivered to the skin of mice. Once this was confirmed, a cocktail of gene factors (ABM) used by Vierbuchen and collaborators to reprogram fibroblast into neurons was used. Delivery of these factors demonstrated successful reprogramming in-vivo and signals propagated from the epidermis to the dermis skin layers. This phenomenon is believed to be mediated by extracellular vesicles and potentially other factors [18]. Successful reprogramming was determined by performing histology and electrophysiological tests to confirm the tissue behaved as functional neurons.

Beyond inducing neurons, Gallego-Perez et al. also set out to induce endothelial cells in an ischemic mouse limb that, without proper blood flow, becomes necrotic and decays. Using a patented cocktail of plasmids (Etv2, Fli1, Foxc2, or EFF), these factors were delivered to the tissue above the surgery site. Using various methods, including histology and laser speckle imaging, perfusion and the establishment of new vasculature was verified as early as 7 days post-treatment.

The technique was developed to combat the limitations of current approaches, such as a shortage in donors to supply cell sources and the need to induce pluripotency. Reprogramming cells in vivo takes advantage of readily available cells, bypassing the need for pre-processing. Most reprogramming methods have a heavy reliance on viral transfection. TNT allows for implementation of a non-viral approach which is able to overcome issues of capsid size, increase safety, and increase deterministic reprogramming.

== Development ==
The tissue nanotransfection technique was developed as a method to efficiently and benignly deliver cargo to living tissues. This technique builds on the high-throughput nanoelectroporation methods developed for cell reprogramming applications by Lee and Gallego-Perez of Ohio State's Chemical and Biomolecular Engineering department. Sen (Surgery/Regenerative Medicine) adapted this technology, in collaboration with Lee in Engineering, for in vivo tissue reprogramming applications with Gallego-Perez serving the role of a shared fellow between the two programs. Development was a joint effort between OSU's College of Engineering and College of Medicine led by Gallego-Perez (Ph.D), Lee (Ph.D), and Sen (Ph.D).

This technology was fabricated using cleanroom techniques and photolithography and deep reactive ion etching (DRIE) of silicon wafers to create nanochannels with backside etching of a reservoir for loading desired factors as described in Gallego-Perez et al 2017. This chip is then connected to an electrical source capable of delivering an electrical field to drive the factors from the reservoir into the nanochannels, and onto the contacted tissue. Later, with support from Xuan, Sen developed the current version of the tissue nanotransfection chip.
