= Hydrodynamic delivery =

Gene Transfer Method

Hydrodynamic Delivery (HD) is a method of DNA insertion in rodent models. Genes are delivered via injection into the bloodstream of the animal, and are expressed in the liver. This protocol is helpful to determine gene function, regulate gene expression, and develop pharmaceuticals in vivo.

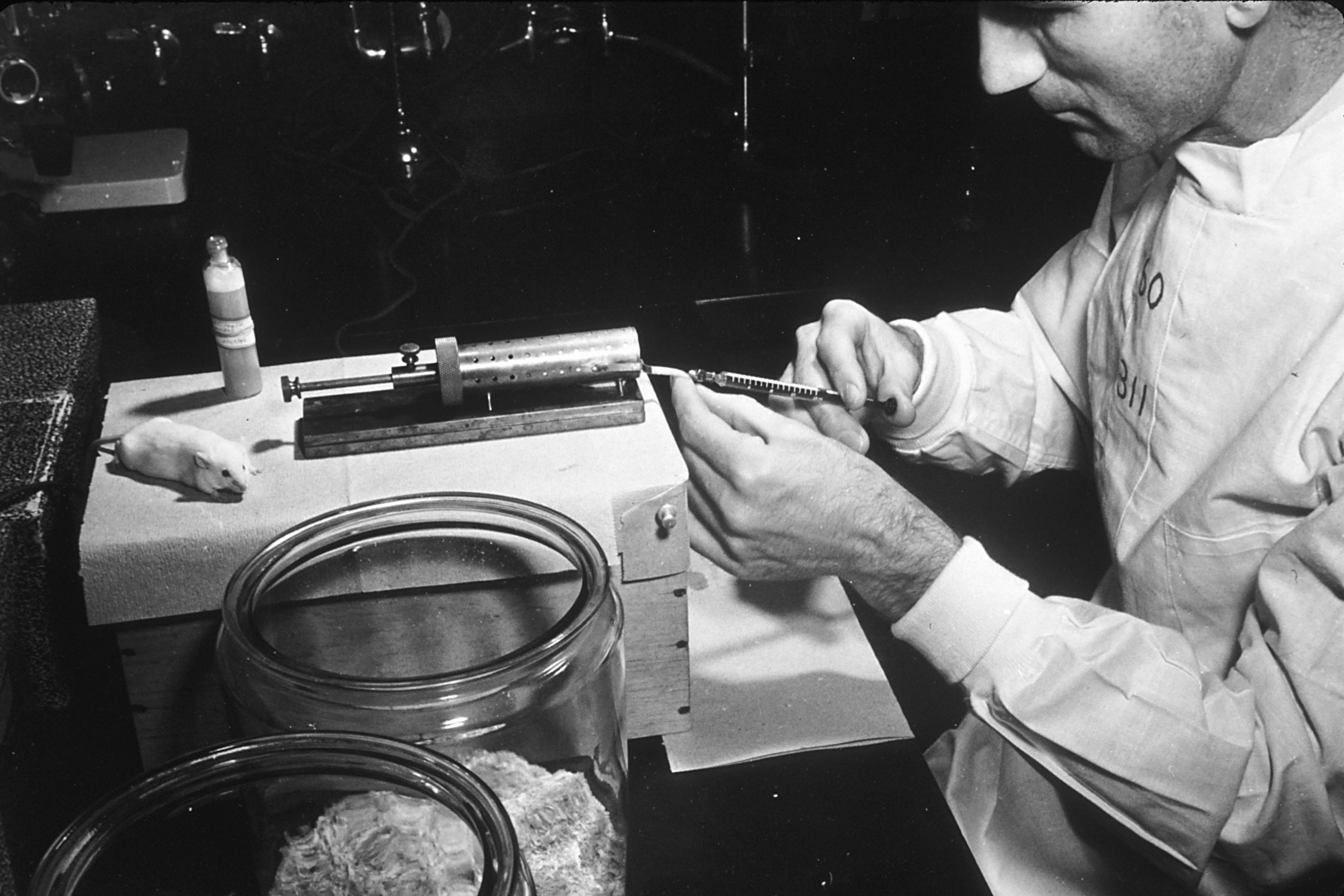
W. Heston giving an intravenous injection to mice. Heston, around 1944, studied pulmonary tumors and heredity in mice with an attempt to localize tumor susceptibility to specific genes.

== Methods ==
Hydrodynamic Delivery was developed as a way to insert genes without viral infection (transfection). The procedure requires a high-volume DNA solution to be inserted into the veins of the rodent using a high-pressure needle. The volume of the DNA is typically 8-10% equal to 8-10% of the animal's body weight, and is injected within 5-7 seconds. The pressure of the insertion leads to cardiac congestion (increased pressure in the heart), allowing the DNA solution to flow through the bloodstream and accumulate in the liver. The pressure expands the pores in the cell membrane, forcing the DNA molecules into the parenchyma, or the functional cells of the organ. In the liver, these cells are the hepatocytes. In less than two minutes after the injection, the pressure returns to natural levels, and the pores shrink back, trapping the DNA inside of the cell. After injection, the majority of genes are expressed in the liver of the animal over a long period of time.

Originally developed to insert DNA, further developments in HD have enabled the insertion of RNA, proteins, and short oligonucleotides into cells.

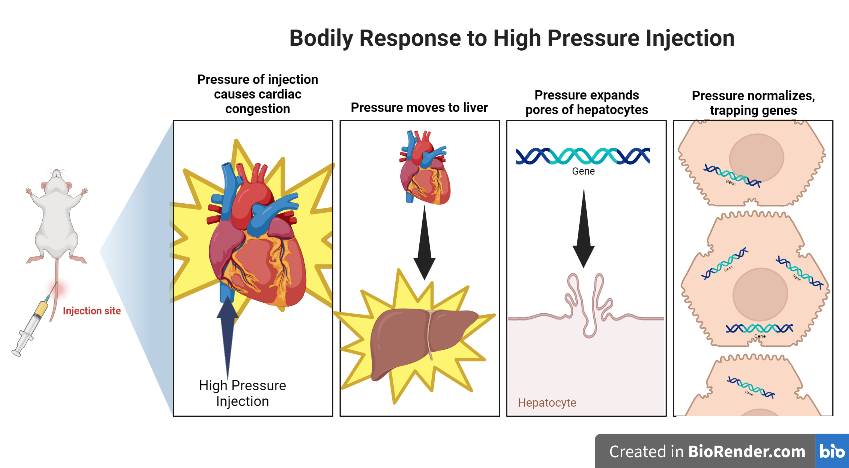
The high pressure of the injection forces the pores of the cell membrane to expand, allowing the DNA to enter the cell. Once pressure drops, the pores shrink back to normal levels, trapping the target DNA in the cells.

== Applications ==
The development of Hydrodynamic Delivery methods allows an alternative way to study in vivo experiments. This method has shown to be effective in small mammals, without the potential risks and complications of viral transfection. Applications of these studies include: testing regulatory elements, generating antibodies, analyzing gene therapy techniques, and developing models for diseases. Typically, genes are expressed in the liver, but the procedure can be altered to express genes in kidneys, lungs, muscles, heart, and pancreas.

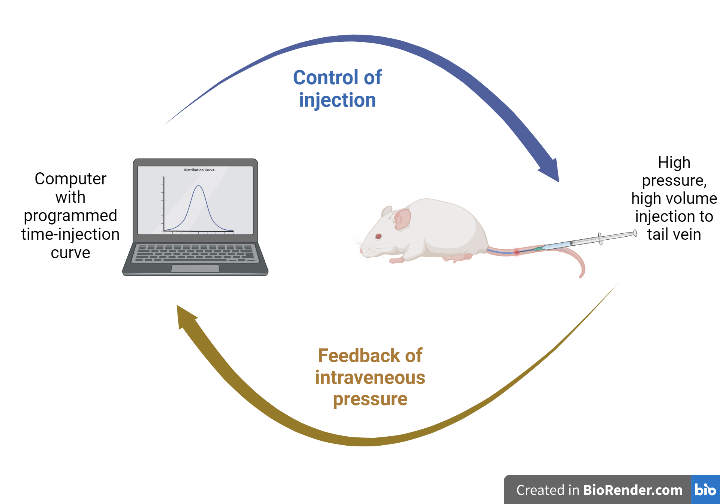
Hydrodynamic Delivery involves a high pressure, high volume injection, which is controlled and monitored by a computer programmed with a time-injection curve.

=== Gene therapy ===
Hydrodynamic Delivery has been used to insert genes in an effort to combat genetic diseases. Since HD has mainly focused on small mammals such as rodents, its application in humans is limited. Ongoing research is increasing applications in large mammals and future clinical studies. Computer-assisted image-guided techniques allow surgeons to insert the needle or catheter in the precise site, while an automated injection device monitors and adjusts the pressure needed for optimal gene transmission.. With more precise injections, the volume of DNA solution can be reduced to about 1% of the organism's body weight

By using a catheter to conduct the injection, surgeons are able to express genes in organs other than the liver. Placing the catheter in alternate locations allows the DNA solution to reach the target, although genes are still expressed in the liver.

=== Developing model organisms ===
Hydrodynamic DNA delivery is a useful tool for creating model systems for human disease. Using this technique, laboratories are able to study genetic diseases in vivo. Studies are able to insert oncogenes into lab animals to study treatments. In addition to gene transfer, HD has also been shown to work in tumor cells. Metastatic cancer cells can be successfully delivered in model organisms in order to study specific cancers.

== Alternative non-viral transfection methods ==
Alternative methods can be used to insert genes into an organism without a viral vector. These can be split into physical and chemical techniques.

Physical methods:

- Electroporation
- Gene gun
- Sonoporation
- Microneedle
- Magnetofection

Chemical methods:

- Cationic lipids
- Cationic polymers
- Dendrimer-based vectors
- Polypeptide-based vectors
- Inorganic, polymeric, and lipid nanoparticles
- Gemini surfactants
