= Optical transfection =

Optical transfection is a biomedical technique that entails introducing nucleic acids (i.e. genetic material such as DNA) into cells using light. All cells are surrounded by a plasma membrane, which prevents many substances from entering or exiting the cell. Lasers can be used to burn a tiny hole in this membrane, allowing substances to enter. This is tremendously useful to biologists who are studying disease, as a common experimental requirement is to put things (such as DNA) into cells.

Typically, a laser is focussed to a diffraction limited spot (~1 μm diameter) using a high numerical aperture microscope objective. The plasma membrane of a cell is then exposed to this highly focussed light for a small amount of time (typically tens of milliseconds to seconds), generating a transient pore on the membrane. The generation of a photopore allows exogenous plasmid DNA, RNA, organic fluorophores, or larger objects such as semiconductor quantum nanodots to enter the cell. In this technique, one cell at a time is treated, making it particularly useful for single cell analysis.

This technique was first demonstrated in 1984 by Tsukakoshi et al., who used a frequency tripled Nd:YAG to generate stable and transient transfection of normal rat kidney cells. Since this time, the optical transfection of a host of mammalian cell types has been demonstrated using a variety of laser sources, including the 405 nm continuous wave (cw), 488 nm cw, or pulsed sources such as the 800 nm femtosecond pulsed Ti:Sapphire or 1064 nm nanosecond pulsed Nd:YAG.

== Terminology ==
The meaning of the term transfection has evolved. The original meaning of transfection was "infection by transformation", i.e. introduction of DNA (or RNA) from a prokaryote-infecting virus or bacteriophage into cells, resulting in an infection. Because the term transformation had another sense in animal cell biology (a genetic change allowing long-term propagation in culture, or acquisition of properties typical of cancer cells), the term transfection acquired, for animal cells, its present meaning of a change in cell properties caused by introduction of DNA (or other nucleic acid species such as RNA or SiRNA).

Because of this strict definition of transfection, optical transfection also refers only to the introduction of nucleic acid species. The introduction of other impermeable compounds into a cell, such as organic fluorophores or semiconductor quantum nanodots is not strictly speaking "transfection," and is therefore referred to as "optical injection" or one of the many other terms now outlined.

The lack of a unified name for this technology makes reviewing the literature on the subject very difficult. Optical injection has been described using over a dozen different names or phrases (see bulleted lists below). Some trends in the literature are clear. The first term of the technique is invariably a derivation of word laser, optical, or photo, and the second term is usually in reference to injection, transfection, poration, perforation or puncture. Like many cellular perturbations, when a single cell or group of cells is treated with a laser, three things can happen: the cell dies (overdose), the cell membrane is permeabilised, substances enter, and the cell recovers (therapeutic dose), or nothing happens (underdose). There have been suggestions in the literature to reserve the term optoinjection for when a therapeutic dose is delivered upon a single cell, and the term optoporation for when a laser generated shockwave treats a cluster of many (10s to 100s) cells. The first definition of optoinjection is uncontroversial. The definition of optoporation, however, has failed to be adopted, with a similar number of references using the term to denote the dosing of single cells as those using the term to denote the simultaneous dosing of clusters of many cells

As the field stands, it is the opinion of the authors of a review article on the subject that the term optoinjection always be included as a keyword in future publications, regardless of their own naming preferences.

Terms agreed by consensus

- Optoinjection (or any derivations of laser injection, optical injection, photoinjection): The transfer of any membrane impermeable substance into a cell using light. A general term that also encompasses optical transfection.
- Optical transfection (or any derivations of laser transfection, optotransfection, phototransfection): A specific type of optical transfection - the transfer of nucleic acids into a cell using light for the purposes of eliciting protein translation from those acids. To be in line with the current definition of transfection in the biological community, non-nucleic acids (such as fluorophores) cannot, by definition, be optically transfected (only optically injected).
- Photoporation (or any derivations of [laser-] or [optical-] or [opto-] or [photo-] AND [ poration] or [-permeabilisation] or [-puncture] or [-perforation]): The generation of a transient hole or holes on the plasma membrane (or cell wall) of a cell usually for the purpose of optical injection. See possible exception: Optoporation
- -surgery (such as cell nanosurgery, laser nanosurgery, laser surgery): A general term that incorporates all of the above definitions, but also includes the concepts of the ablation or optical manipulation of cell material for other purposes besides pore generation. Examples include selective cell ablation to purify cell populations, chromosome dissection, cytoskeleton disruption, organelle ablation, axotomy, or the optical tweezing or isolation of intracellular material.

Terms under deliberation

- Optoporation: Has been suggested to mean the dosing of a cluster of cells with a shockwave mediated mechanism, which usually results in a doughnut shaped therapeutic zone. On the contrary, has also been synonymously used with the term photoporation.
- Laserfection: Has been suggested to mean the dosing of a cluster of cells with a circularly shaped therapeutic zone. Term reserved for Cyntellect's laser-enabled analysis and processing (LEAP) system.
- Light-induced convective transmembrane transport: A newly coined term for optoinjection.

Some of the above was reproduced with permission from.

== Methods ==
A typical optical transfection protocol is as follows: 1) Build an optical tweezers system with a high NA objective 2) Culture cells to 50-60% confluency 3) Expose cells to at least 10 μg/mL of plasmid DNA 4) Dose the plasma membrane of each cell with 10-40 ms of focussed laser, at a power of <100 mW at focus 5) Observe transient transfection 24-96h later 6) Add selective medium if the generation of stable colonies is desired

== See also ==
- Transfection
- Transformation
- Transduction
- Cationic liposome
- Nucleofection
- Magnet assisted transfection
