= Nanoinjection =

Nanoinjection is the process of using a microscopic lance (i.e. a nanoneedle) and electrical forces to deliver DNA to a cell. It is claimed to be more effective than microinjection because the lance used is ten times smaller than a micropipette and the method uses no fluid. The nanoinjector mechanism is operated while submerged in a pH buffered solution. Then, a positive electrical charge is applied to the lance, which accumulates negatively charged DNA on its surface. The nanoinjector mechanism then penetrates the zygotic membranes, and a negative charge is applied to the lance, releasing the accumulated DNA within the cell. The lance is required to maintain a constant elevation on both entry and exit of the cell.

Nanoinjection results in a long-term cell viability of 92% following the electrophoretic injection process with a 100 nm diameter nanopipette, the typical diameter of nanoinjection pipet.

Single cell transfections are used to virtually transfer any type of mammalian cell into another using a syringe which creates an entry for DNA to be released. A nano needle is used as a mechanical vector for plasmid DNA. The method can be improved further with Atomic Force Microscopy or AFM. In order to avoid causing permanent damage to the cell or provoke cellular leaking of intracellular fluid, AFM is a tool of choice, as it allows for precise positioning of the DNA, allowing for tip penetration into the cytosol, which is critical for viable DNA transfer into the cell.

Reasons to use nanoinjection include the insertion of genetic material into the genome of a zygote. This method is a critical step in understanding and developing gene functions.

Nanoinjection is also used to genetically modify animals to aid in the research of cancer, Alzheimer's disease, and diabetes.

== History ==
- 1990s - The first paper to claim to use a nanoinjection is published, but actually uses a form of microinjection to inject mice brains with analgesics. Many papers in the 1990s used modified microinjection techniques referred to as "nanoinjections" but do not match the modern definition of nanoinjection.
- 2004 - A nanoscale surgery on a living cell is performed with a sharpened Atomic Force Microscope (AFM) tip. Through sharpening an AFM tip to 200-300 nm in diameter, they found they could successfully perforate both the cellular and nuclear envelopes then withdraw the tip with minimal damage.
- April, 2007 - The first usage of a nanoinjection format similar to modern day nanoinjection is published. They used a custom AFM tip coated in an EGFP encoding plasmid to transfect individual eukaryote cells. They found that they could easily observe when the tip punctured the membrane from the force readings, but could not control how much was released. They successfully caused minimal disturbance to the cells, but only 30% of cells were successfully transfected.
- May, 2007 - A lab at the University of California publishes their findings with using carbon nanotubes as the lance in the AFM. They attached quantum dots to the outside of the lance via a disulfide bridge. This method allowed for high precision and undetectable membrane damage, but is slow and can only transfer limited types of payloads. It requires 15-30 minutes to release the payload in the cell and required a payload that could form disulfide bridges.
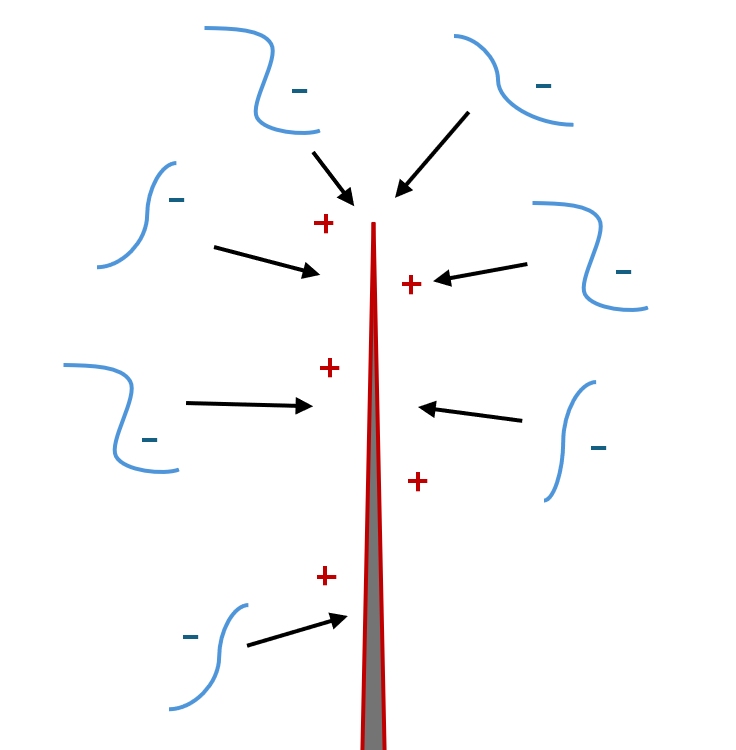
  Positively Charged Nanoinjection Needle Attracts Negatively Charged DNA for Subsequent Injection
- 2011 - A team at BYU successfully attached and released DNA from the outisde of a machined silicone lance. They found that through introducing a positive charge to the lance the negatively charged DNA could be attached until the polarity was flipped. In this way over 6,000 DNA molecules could be delivered with minimal damage to the membrane or cell.
- May 2014 - The same team at BYU used their nanoinjection system to inject 3000 mouse embryos and found that it successfully delivered the DNA payload while minimizing cell death rates. They found a low increased death rate of roughly 7.7% more in the injected zygotes compared to the control.
- May 2014 - A team of researchers constructs an array of solid silicone microlances to inject tens of thousands of cells simultaneously. They found successful delivery to as many as 78% of the cells in the sample and a 78-91% survival rate.
- 2023 - Researchers used nanoinjections and low voltages to add siRNA to cells and knockdown gene expression. They found that they could knock down the gene expression of TRIOBP in indiviadual cells by about 40%.
- 2024 - Researchers explored the effects of different shaped lance tips and protocols to manufacture CAR-T cells. They found significant delivery differences between nanolance shapes and voltage combinations depending on payload type, emphasizing a need for diliberate choice in shape selection when nanoinjections are performed.

== Fabrication ==
The lance is made using the polyMUMPs fabrication technology. It creates a gold layer, and two structural layers that are 2.0 and 1.5 μm thick respectively. It is a simple process, which makes it good as a platform to prototype polysilicon MEMS devices at a low commercial cost of fabrication. The lance has a solid, tapered body, that is 2 μm thick, with a tip width of 150 nm. The taper is set at 7.9°, coming to a maximum width of 11 μm. Two highly folded electrical connections provide an electrical path between the lance and two equivalent bond pads, with a gold wire connecting one of the bond pads to an integrated circuit chip carrier's pin. The carrier is then placed into a custom built electrical socket.

In the situation of fertilizing eggs, the lance is incorporated into a kinematic mechanism consisting of a change-point parallel-guiding six-bar mechanism and a compliant parallel-guiding folded-beam suspension.

== Techniques ==
=== Electrophoretic Injection ===
Electrophoretic injection remains the most common form of nanoinjection. Just as with the other methods, a lance ten times smaller than that of microinjection is used. Preparing the lance for injection, a positive charge is applied, attracting the negatively-charged DNA to its tip. After the lance has reached a desired depth within the cell, the charge is reversed, repelling the DNA into the cell. The typical injection voltages are ±20 V, but can be as low as 50-100 mV.

=== Diffusion ===
A manual force is applied to a center fixture of the injection device, moving the lances through cell membranes and into the cytoplasm or nucleus of adhered cells. The magnitude of the force is measured using a force plate on a small number of injections to obtain an estimate of the manual force. The force plate is arranged to measure the force actually applied to the injection chip (that is, not including the stiffness of the support spring). After holding the force for five seconds, the force is released and the injection device is removed from the cell. The diffusion protocol presented data for comparison against other variations in the injection process.

== Applications ==
By delivering certain particles into cells, diseases can be treated or even cured. Gene therapy is possibly the most common field of foreign material delivery into cells and has great implications for curing human genetic diseases.

For example, in a recent experiment two monkeys colorblind from birth were given gene therapy treatment via microinjection. As a result of gene therapy, both animals had their color vision restored with no apparent side effects. Traditionally, gene therapy has been divided into two categories: biological (viral) vectors and chemical or physical (nonviral) approaches. Although viral vectors are currently the most effective approach to delivering DNA into cells, they have certain limitations, including immunogenicity, toxicity, and limited capacity to carry DNA.

One factor critical to successful gene therapy is the development of efficient delivery systems. Although advances in gene transfer technology, including viral and non-viral vectors, have been made, an ideal vector system has not yet been constructed.

== Alternatives ==
Microinjection is the predecessor to nanoinjection. Still used in biological research, microinjection is useful in the examination of non-living cells or in cases where cell viability does not matter. Using a glass pipette 0.5-1.0 micrometers in diameter, the cell has its membrane damaged upon puncture. As opposed to nanoinjection, microinjection uses DNA-filled liquid driven into the cell under pressure. Depending on factors such as the skill of the operator, survival rates of cells undergoing this procedure can be as high as 56% or as low as 9%.

Other methods exist that target groups of cells, such as electroporation. These methods are incapable of targeting specific cells, and are therefore not usable where efficiency and cell viability are a concern.
