= Magnetofection =

Transfection method using magnetic fields

Magnetofection is a transfection method that uses magnetic fields to concentrate particles containing vectors to target cells in the body. Magnetofection has been adapted to a variety of vectors, including nucleic acids, non-viral transfection systems, and viruses. This method offers advantages such as high transfection efficiency and biocompatibility which are balanced with limitations.

== Mechanism ==
=== Principle ===
The term magnetofection, currently trademarked by the company OZ Biosciences, combines the words magnetic and transfection. Magnetofection uses nucleic acids associated with magnetic nanoparticles. These molecular complexes are then concentrated and transported into cells using an applied magnetic field.

=== Synthesis ===
The magnetic nanoparticles are typically made from iron oxide, which is fully biodegradable, using methods such as coprecipitation or microemulsion.

The nanoparticles are then combined with gene vectors (DNA, siRNA, ODN, virus, etc.). One method involves linking viral particles to magnetic particles using an avidin-biotin interaction. Viruses can also bind to the nanoparticles via hydrophobic interaction.

Another synthesis method involves coating magnetic nanoparticles with cationic lipids or polymers via salt-induced aggregation. For example, nanoparticles may be conjugated with the polyethylenimine (PEI), a positively charged polymer used commonly as a transfection agent. The PEI solution must have a high pH during synthesis to encourage high gene expression. The positively charged nanoparticles can then associate with negatively charged nucleic acids via electrostatic interaction.

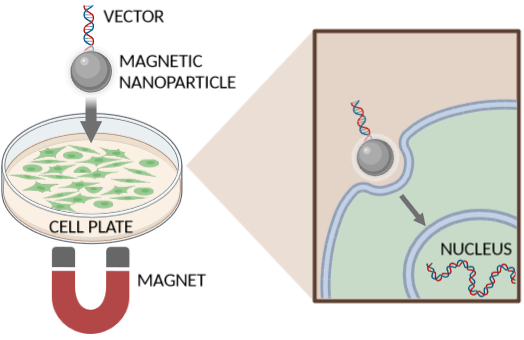
The process of magnetofection. Magnet concentrates nanoparticles with gene vectors to cells for transfection.

=== Cellular uptake ===
Magnetic particles loaded with vectors are concentrated on the target cells by the influence of an external magnetic field. The cells then take up genetic material naturally via endocytosis and pinocytosis. Consequently, membrane architecture and structure stays intact, in contrast to other physical transfection methods such as electroporation or gene guns that damage the cell membrane.

The nucleic acids are then released into the cytoplasm by different mechanisms depending upon the formulation used:

1. the proton sponge effect caused by cationic polymers coated on the nanoparticles that promote endosome osmotic swelling, disruption of the endosome membrane and intracellular release of DNA form,
2. the destabilization of endosome by cationic lipids coated on the particles that release the nucleic acid into cells by flip-flop of cell negative lipids and charge neutralization and
3. the viral infection mechanism.

Magnetofection works with cells that are not dividing or slowly dividing, meaning that the genetic materials can go to the cell nucleus without cell division.

== Applications ==
Magnetofection has been tested on a broad range of cell lines, hard-to-transfect and primary cells. Several optimized and efficient magnetic nanoparticle formulations have been specifically developed for several types of applications such as DNA, siRNA, and primary neuron transfection as well as viral applications.

Magnetofection research is currently in the preclinical stage. This technique has primarily been tested in vivo using plasmid DNA in mouse, rat, and rabbit models for applications in the hippocampus, subcutaneous tumors, lungs, spinal cord, and muscle.

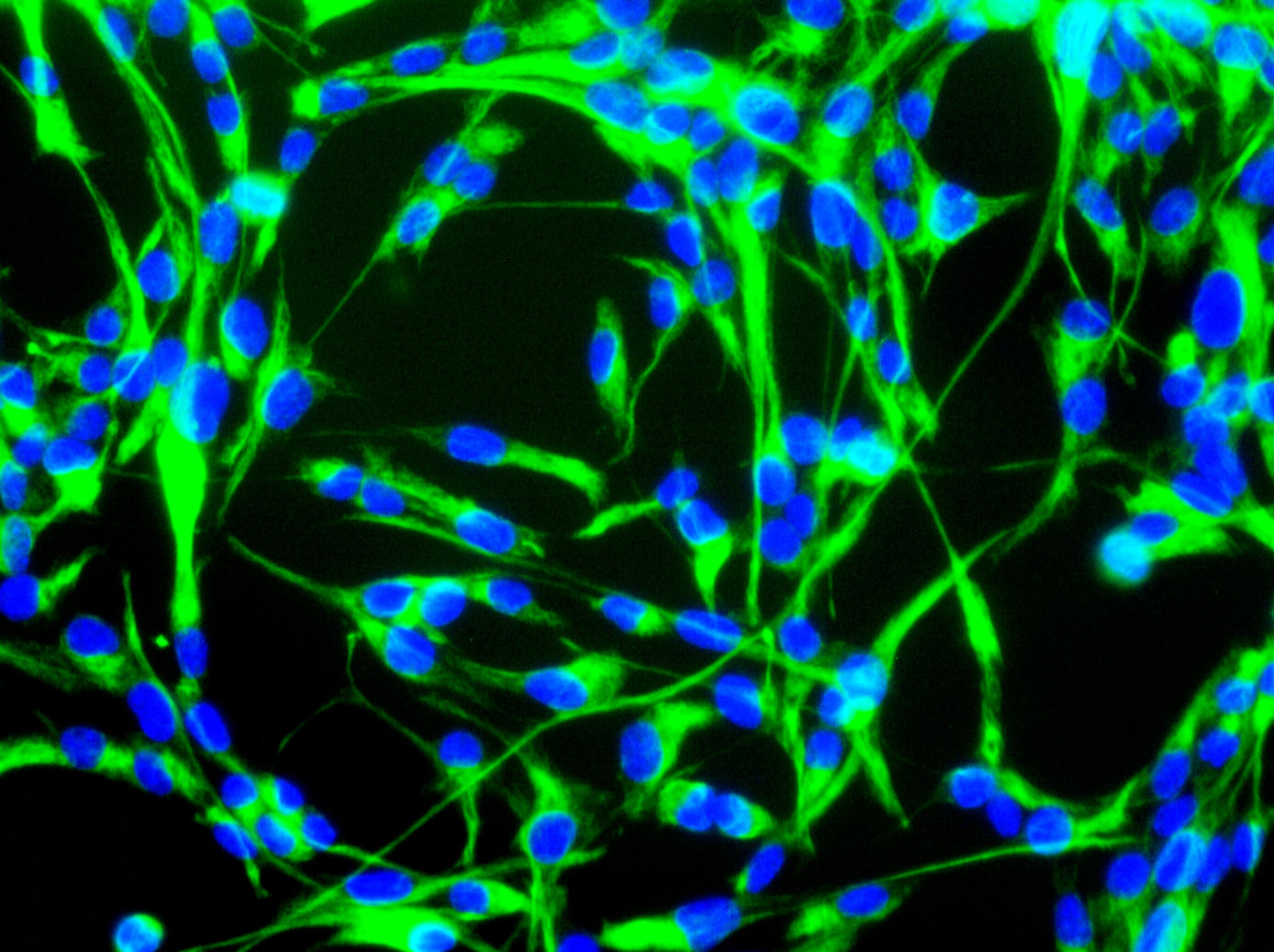
Neural stem cells growing in culture.

Some applications include:

- Delivery of GFP gene into primary neural stem cells, which are typically difficult to transfect, with 18% efficacy with a static magnetic field and 32% efficacy with an oscillating field.
- Delivery of oligodesoxynucleotides (ODN) into human umbilical vein endothelial cells with 84% efficiency.
- Delivery of siRNA to HeLa cells to knock down luciferase reporter gene.
- Delivery of adenoviral vectors to primary human peripheral blood lymphocytes.

== Advantages ==
Magnetofection attempts to unite the advantages of biochemical (cationic lipids or polymers) and physical (electroporation, gene gun) transfection methods. It allows for local delivery with high transfection efficiency, faster incubation time, and biocompatibility.

=== Transfection efficiency ===
Coupling magnetic nanoparticles to gene vectors results in hundreds-fold increase of the uptake of these vectors on a time scale of minutes, thus leading to high transfection efficiency. Gene vector and magnetic nanoparticle complexes are transfected into cells after 10–15 minutes, which is faster than the 2–4 hours that other transfection methods require. After 24, 48 or 72 hours, most of the particles are localized in the cytoplasm, in vacuoles (membranes surrounded structure into cells) and occasionally in the cell nucleus.

=== Biocompatibility ===
Magnetic nanoparticles do not aggregate easily once the magnet is removed, and therefore are unlikely to block capillaries or cause thrombosis. In addition, iron oxide is biodegradable, and the iron can be reused in hemoglobin or iron metabolism pathways.

== Disadvantages ==
=== Particle variability ===
Magnetic nanoparticle synthesis can sometimes lead to a wide range of differently sized particles. The size of particles can influence their usefulness. Specifically, nanoparticles that are less than 10 nm or greater than 200 nm in size tend to be cleared from the body more quickly.

=== Localization in vivo ===
While magnets can be used to localize magnetic nanoparticles to desired cells, this mechanism may be difficult to maintain in practice. The nanoparticles can be concentrated in 2D space such as on a culture plate or at the surface of the body, but it can be more difficult to localize them in the 3D space of the body. Magnetofection does not work well for organs or blood vessels far from the surface of the body, since the magnetic field weakens as distance increases. In addition, the user must consider the frequency and timing of applying the magnetic field, as the particles will not necessarily stay in the desired location once the magnet is removed.

=== Cytotoxicity ===
While iron oxide used to make nanoparticles is biodegradable, the toxicity of magnetic nanoparticles is still under investigation. Some research has found no signs of damage to cells, while others claim that small (< 2 nm) nanoparticles can diffuse across cell membranes and disrupt organelles.

In addition, very high concentrations of iron oxide can disrupt homeostasis and lead to iron overload, which can damage or alter DNA, affect cellular responses, and kill cells. Lysosymes can also digest the nanoparticles and release free iron which can react with hydrogen peroxide to form free radicals, leading to cytotoxic, mutagenic, and carcinogenic effects.

== See also ==
- Magnet-assisted transfection
