= Magnet-assisted transfection =

Magnet-assisted transfection is a transfection method which uses magnetic interactions to deliver DNA into target cells. Nucleic acids are associated with magnetic nanoparticles, and magnetic fields drive the nucleic acid-particle complexes into target cells, where the nucleic acids are released.

== Magnetic Nanoparticles ==
Nanoparticles used as carriers for nucleic acids are mostly iron oxides. These iron oxides can be generated by precipitation from acidic iron-salt solutions upon addition of appropriate bases. The magnetic nanoparticles have an approximate size of 100 nm and are additionally coated with biological polymers to allow loading of nucleic acids. Particles and nucleic acids form complexes by ionic interaction of the negatively charged nucleic acid and the positively charged surface of the magnetic nanoparticle.

== DNA delivery to the target cells ==
The binding of the negatively charged nucleic acids to the positively charged iron particles occurs relatively fast. After complex formation, the loaded particles are incubated together with the target cells on a magnetic plate. The magnetic field causes the iron particles to be rapidly drawn towards the surface of the cell membrane. Cellular uptake occurs by either endocytosis or pinocytosis. Once delivered to the target cells, the DNA is released into the cytoplasm. The magnetic particles are accumulated in endosomes and/or vacuoles. Over time, the nanoparticles are degraded and the iron enters the normal iron metabolism. Influence of cellular functions by iron particles has not been reported yet. In most cases the increased iron concentration in culture media does not lead to cytotoxic effects.

== Advantages and prospects ==
Magnet-assisted transfection is a relatively new and time-saving method to introduce nucleic acids into a target cell with increased efficiency. In particular, adherent mammalian cell lines and primary cell cultures show very high transfection rates. Suspension cells and cells from other organisms can also be successfully transfected. A major advantage of the method is the mild treatment of the cells in comparison to liposome-based transfection reagents (lipofection) and electroporation, which may result in the death of 20-50% of cells. In addition, the transfection efficiency is increased in numerous cases by the directed transport in a magnetic field, especially for low amounts of nucleic acids. In contrast, methods like lipofection offer only statistical hits between cargo and cells, because of the three-dimensional motion of cells and transfection aggregates in a liquid suspension. Magnet-assisted transfection can also be performed in the presence of serum, which is a further benefit. Currently, there are over 150 cells known to be successfully transfected. Additionally, synergistic effects in transfection efficiency can arise from the possible combination of lipofection and magnet-assisted transfection. In future, this technology might be also an alternative strategy to the currently used viral and non-viral vectors in gene-therapy and gene transfer.

== See also ==
- Magnetofection
