= Nucleofection =

Nucleofection is an electroporation-based transfection method which enables transfer of nucleic acids such as DNA and RNA into cells by applying a specific voltage and reagents. Nucleofection, also referred to as nucleofector technology, was invented by the biotechnology company Amaxa. "Nucleofector" and "nucleofection" are trademarks owned by Lonza Cologne AG, part of the Lonza Group.

== Applications ==
Nucleofection is a method to transfer substrates into mammalian cells so far considered difficult or even impossible to transfect. Examples for such substrates are nucleic acids, like the DNA of an isolated gene cloned into a plasmid, or small interfering RNA (siRNA) for knocking down expression of a specific endogenous gene.

Primary cells, for example stem cells, especially fall into this category, although many other cell lines are also difficult to transfect. Primary cells are freshly isolated from body tissue and thus cells are unchanged, closely resembling the in-vivo situation, and are therefore of particular relevance for medical research purposes. In contrast, cell lines have often been cultured for decades and may significantly differ from their origin.

== Mechanism ==
Based on the physical method of electroporation, nucleofection uses a combination of electrical parameters, generated by a device called Nucleofector, with cell-type specific reagents. The substrate is transferred directly into the cell nucleus and the cytoplasm. In contrast, other commonly used non-viral transfection methods rely on cell division for the transfer of DNA into the nucleus. Thus, nucleofection provides the ability to transfect even non-dividing cells, such as neuron and resting blood cells. Before the introduction of the Nucleofector Technology, efficient gene transfer into primary cells had been restricted to the use of viral vectors, which typically involve disadvantages such as safety risks, lack of reliability, and high cost. The non-viral gene transfer methods available were not suitable for the efficient transfection of primary cells. Non-viral delivery methods may require cell division for completion of transfection, since the DNA enters the nucleus during breakdown of the nuclear envelope upon cell division or by a specific localization sequence. Optimal nucleofection conditions depend upon the individual cell type, not on the substrate being transfected. This means that identical conditions are used for the nucleofection of DNA, RNA, siRNAs, shRNAs, mRNAs and pre-mRNAs, BACs, peptides, morpholinos, PNA, or other biologically active molecules.

== See also ==
- Electroporation
