= Lewis lung carcinoma =

1951 mouse tumour still used in research

Lewis lung carcinoma is a hypermutated Kras/Nras–mutant cancer with extensive regional mutation clusters in its genome. A tumor that spontaneously developed as an epidermoid carcinoma in the lung of a C57BL mouse. It was discovered in 1951 by Dr. Margaret Lewis of the Wistar Institute and became one of the first transplantable tumors.

Thirty-three deleterious mutations are present in 30 cancer genes including Kras, Nras, Trp53, Dcc, and Cacna1d. Cdkn2a and Cdkn2b are biallelically deleted from the genome. Five pathways (RTK/RAS, p53, cell cycle, TGFB, and Hippo) are oncogenically deregulated or affected. The major mutational processes in LLC include chromosomal instability, exposure to metabolic mutagens, spontaneous 5–methylcytosine deamination, defective DNA mismatch repair, and reactive oxygen species. Data also suggests that LLC is a lung cancer similar to human lung adenocarcinoma.

== Models ==
=== Syngeneic ===
According to a 2015 review article, Lewis lung carcinoma is the only reproducible syngeneic lung cancer model, meaning that it is the only reproducible lung cancer model that utilizes a transplant that is immunologically compatible. Syngeneic models have proven to be useful in predicting the clinical benefit of therapy in preclinical experiments. However, there has been criticism directed towards syngeneic model usage when attempting to translate therapies from another species to humans. For example, cancer therapies that exhibited promising results in mouse models can and have failed in clinical trials due to physiological differences in the activity of the targeted gene product. The activity of the mouse product did not translate to the activity of the human counterpart.

=== Orthotopic ===
Lewis lung carcinoma can also be utilized as an orthotopic model. Orthotopic models focus upon correctly modeling the tumor microenvironment by injecting or implanting tumors into the corresponding organ that they originated from (i.e. implanting a Lewis lung carcinoma into the lung of another C57BL mouse). Because of this fidelity to mimicking the tumor microenvironment, orthotopic models are considered to be more physiologically relevant in representing human tumorigenesis. However, the creation of such models is a typically more involved and technically challenging process. They also require more complex imaging modalities for data collection.

== Characterization ==
Generally, Lewis lung carcinoma is highly metastatic in immunocompetent mice. If subcutaneously injected into mice, it is known to avidly metastasize to the lung. In fact, a 1996 study found that the carcinoma predominantly metastasized into the lungs after tail vein injections. Lewis lung carcinoma has the appearance of a semi-firm homogeneous mass that is not grossly hemorrhagic.

Tumor progression was observed after subcutaneous injection into the dorsal subcutis for 107 wild type, 129/Black Swiss mice. These mice were selected for their genetic background proximity to C57BL/6J mice. They observed the progression as being characterized by skin ulceration followed by ulcer hemorrhaging. Not only that, there was also basal hemorrhaging and/or edema.

The cells were anaplastic, varying in size and shape; and they appeared to have little cytoplasm. The nuclei of the cells were highly distorted and prominent.

The tumors were highly vascularized and metastasized to different sites, including the lungs, lymph nodes, liver, pleural cavity, diaphragm, pericardium, cardiac muscle, pancreas, adipose tissue, and esophagus. In cases of lung metastasis, large tumor masses underwent necrosis, with some of them hemorrhaging and even fewer exhibiting acute inflammation. Smaller metastases positioned themselves to be eccentric or concentric to vessels. In large tumor nodules, the cells grew, without patterning, into confluent sheets. The nodules had capillaries predominantly forming and supplying blood to the surface. The capillaries were fine and thin-walled. The nodules did exhibit expansion, interfering with and invading the space of surrounding tissues. This caused tissue degeneration.

== Research ==
The Lewis lung carcinoma tumor model's role in cancer has been its use for research into tumor metastasis and angiogenesis properties. The model is also useful for chemotherapeutic testing in vivo. Navelbine and carboplatin, two chemotherapeutics currently on the market, were tested in C57BL mice with Lewis lung carcinoma tumors in their hind flank. Tumor regression reached 72.7% in the navelbine trials, with the carboplatin trials showing that 30-50 percent of the population had a prolonged tumor survival after treatment with carboplatin and paclitaxel.

Melittin, a polypeptide found in bee venom, on tumor-associated macrophages has been examined in a Lewis lung carcinoma model. Melittin has a background in research as a possible cancer drug due to its activity against malignant cells. Tumor-associated macrophages facilitate tumor progression through the promotion of angiogenesis and immunosuppression. In the in vivo tests, melittin inhibited rapid tumor growth and was correlated with decreased angiogenesis marker levels, VEGF and CD31.

Toll-like receptor 4 mediates cancer-induced muscle wasting in a Lewis lung carcinoma model. It does so by directly activating muscle catabolism and stimulating an innate immune response in the mice.

Targeting of CD169^{+} macrophages in order to inhibit tumor Lewis lung carcinoma growth also caused depletion of bone and bone marrow in mice. This depletion disrupted bone homeostasis and caused bone weight loss and a bone density decrease in mice. Not only that, erythropoietic activity was severely impaired. Therefore, the use of CD169^{+} macrophage targeting cancer therapies requires careful consideration of pitfalls.

Cannabinoids suppress Lewis lung carcinoma cell growth. The mechanism of this action was shown to be inhibition of DNA synthesis Cannabinoids increase the life span of mice carrying Lewis lung tumors and decrease primary tumor size. There are multiple modes of action.
