= John C. Sanford =

American plant geneticist

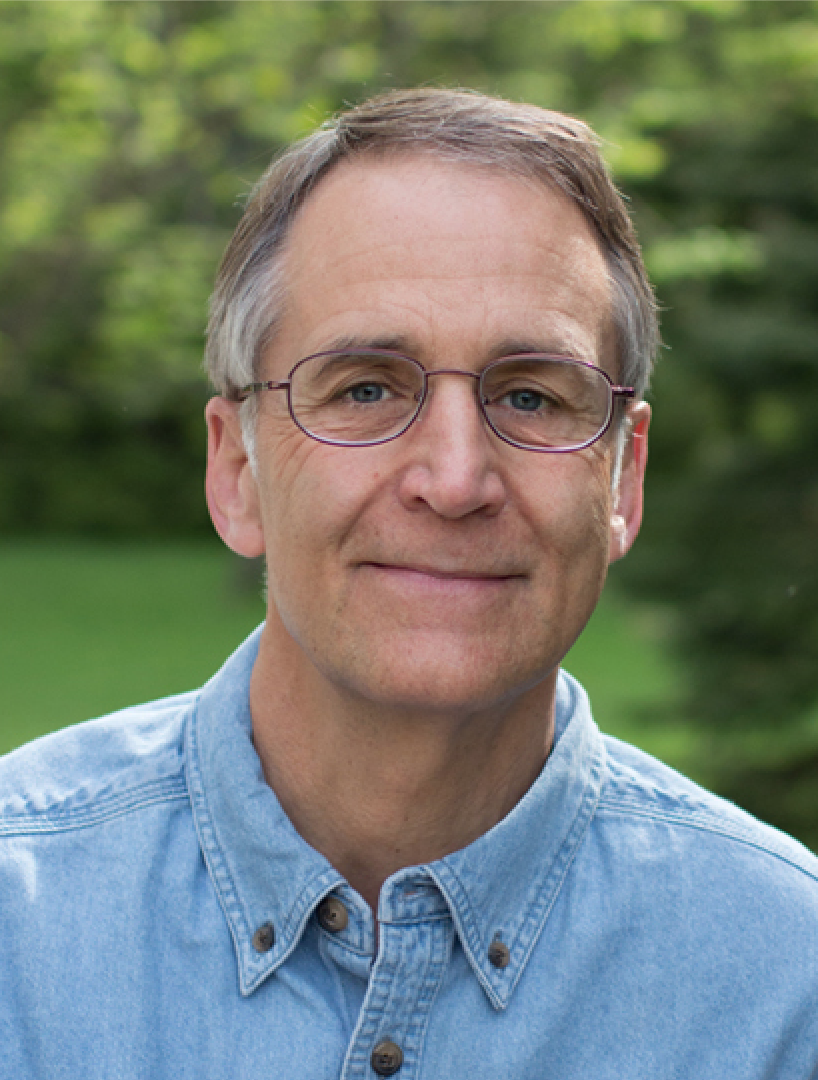
- Sanford in 2014
- Born: 28 June 1950 (age 76)
- Education: University of Minnesota (BS); University of Wisconsin–Madison (MS, PhD)
- Known for: Gene gun, publications, patents
- Scientific career
- Fields: Genetics
- Workplaces: University of Wisconsin-Madison (1976-1980); Cornell University (1980-1998); Duke University

John C. Sanford is an American geneticist and inventor. From 1980 to 1998 he was a professor at Cornell University. After retirement at Cornell, he continued as courtesy professor. After his retirement, he became a young earth creationist and began advocating for the pseudoscience of intelligent design.

== Biography ==
=== Academic career ===
Sanford graduated in 1976 from the University of Minnesota with a Bachelor of Science in horticulture. He went to the University of Wisconsin–Madison where he received a Master of Science in 1978 and a Ph.D. in 1980 in plant breeding/plant genetics. Although retiring in 1998, Sanford continued at Cornell University as a Courtesy Associate Professor between 1998 and 2017. He held an honorary Adjunct Associate Professor of Botany at Duke University. Sanford has published over 100 scientific publications.

=== Inventions ===
At Cornell, Sanford and colleagues developed the "Biolistic Particle Delivery System" or so-called "gene gun". He is the co-inventor of the Pathogen-derived Resistance (PDR) process and the co-inventor of the genetic vaccination process. In 1998 he retired on the proceeds from the sale of his biotech companies and continued at Cornell as a courtesy associate professor.

=== Conversion and intelligent design ===
Formerly an atheist from the mid-1980s, Sanford has looked into theistic evolution (1985–late 1990s), Old Earth creation (late 1990s), and Young Earth creation (2000–present). An advocate of intelligent design, Sanford testified in 2005 in the Kansas evolution hearings on behalf of intelligent design, during which he denied the principle of common descent and "humbly offered... that we were created by a special creation, by God".

He stated that he believed the age of the Earth was "less than 100,000" years. Sanford uses an analogy to illustrate evidence of design — that of a car versus a junkyard: "A car is complex, but so is a junkyard. However, a car is complex in a way that is very specific — which is why it works. It requires a host of very intelligent engineers to specify its complexity, so it is a functional whole." Intelligent-design advocate William Dembski cites the accomplishments of Sanford as evidence of the scientific status of intelligent design, since Sanford is a specialist in genetic engineering and a Courtesy Associate Professor in Horticulture. The scientific community rejects intelligent design and does not consider it science.

=== Genetic Entropy & the Mystery of the Genome ===
Sanford has argued for genetic load in his book Genetic Entropy & the Mystery of the Genome (2005, 2008).

In it, he claims that natural selection's being the cause of biological evolution (which he calls the primary axiom) "is essentially indefensible".

His argument is as follows: The minimal rate of human mutation is estimated to be 100 new mutations per generation. According to Sanford, Kimura's curve shows that most mutations have a near-neutral effect, and are furthermore slightly deleterious. As such, natural selection is unable to slow the accumulation of harmful mutations. Therefore, over time, fitness will decline and, if unchecked, extinction will ultimately result.

An important corollary is that "beneficial mutations are so rare as to be outside of consideration." Therefore, natural selection is considered too slow to allow evolution.Additionally, the selective cost is considered too high to override genetic drift and noise.

Evolutionary biologists disagree with Sanford's ideas, asserting that beneficial mutations are not as rare as Sanford claims and that natural selection would filter out individuals with too many harmful mutations, while the rest persevere. Kimura himself disagrees with Sanford's interpretation of the mutation distribution, excluding beneficial mutations because they would have too large an effect, not an insignificant one.

=== Mendel's Accountant ===
Sanford and colleagues developed the quantitative forward genetic modeling program called Mendel's Accountant, publishing several papers on it and genetic entropy in peer-reviewed venues.

Mendel's Accountant is designed to track mutations as they accumulate in digital populations. Based on his research, Sanford holds that the human genome is deteriorating, and therefore could not have evolved through a process of mutation and selection as specified by the modern evolutionary synthesis.
