= Sonoporation =

Technique in molecular biology

Schematic of Sonoporation Mechanism. This figure depicts the general understanding of sonoporation where a dedicated sonoporator applies ultrasound to induce microbubble cavitation and eventually pore formation. The therapeutic gene or drug of interest thus may translocate within the cell.

Sonoporation, or cellular sonication, is the use of sound in the ultrasonic range for increasing the permeability of the cell plasma membrane. This technique is usually used in molecular biology and non-viral gene therapy in order to allow uptake of large molecules such as DNA into the cell, in a cell disruption process called transfection or transformation. Sonoporation employs the acoustic cavitation of microbubbles to enhance delivery of these large molecules. The exact mechanism of sonoporation-mediated membrane translocation remains unclear, with a few different hypotheses currently being explored.

Sonoporation is under active study for the introduction of foreign genes in tissue culture cells, especially mammalian cells. Sonoporation is also being studied for use in targeted Gene therapy in vivo, in a medical treatment scenario whereby a patient is given modified DNA, and an ultrasonic transducer might target this modified DNA into specific regions of the patient's body. The bioactivity of this technique is similar to, and in some cases found superior to, electroporation. Extended exposure to low-frequency (<MHz) ultrasound has been demonstrated to result in complete cellular death (rupturing), thus cellular viability must also be accounted for when employing this technique.

== Equipment ==
Sonoporation is performed with a dedicated sonoporator. Sonoporation may also be performed with custom-built piezoelectric transducers connected to bench-top function generators and acoustic amplifiers. Standard ultrasound medical devices may also be used in some applications.

Measurement of the acoustics used in sonoporation is listed in terms of mechanical index, which quantifies the likelihood that exposure to diagnostic ultrasound will produce an adverse biological effect by a non-thermal action based on pressure.

== Microbubble contrast agents ==
Microbubble contrast agents are generally used in contrast-enhanced ultrasound applications to enhance the acoustic impact of ultrasound. For sonoporation specifically, microbubbles are used to significantly enhance membrane translocation of molecular therapeutics.

=== General features ===
The microbubbles used today are composed of a gas core and a surrounding shell. The makeup of these elements may vary depending on the preferred physical and chemical properties. Microbubble shells have been formed with lipids, galactose, albumin, or polymers. The gas core can be made up of air or heavy gases like nitrogen or perfluorocarbon.

=== Mechanism of action ===
Microbubble gas cores have high compressibility relative to their liquid environment, making them highly responsive to acoustic application. As a result of ultrasound stimulation, microbubbles undergo expansion and contraction, a phenomenon called stable cavitation. If a microbubble is attached to the cell membrane, the microbubble oscillations produced by ultrasound stimulation may push and pull on the membrane to produce a membrane opening. These rapid oscillations are also responsible for adjacent fluid flow called microstreaming which increases pressure on surrounding cells producing further sonoporation to whole cell populations. The physical mechanisms supposedly involved with microbubble-enhanced sonoporation have been referred to as push, pull, microstreaming, translation, and jetting.

== Membrane translocation mechanism ==
The mechanism by which molecules cross cellular membrane barriers during sonoporation remains unclear. Different theories exist that may potentially explain barrier permeabilization and molecular delivery. The dominant hypotheses include pore formation, endocytosis, and membrane wounds.

=== Pore formation ===
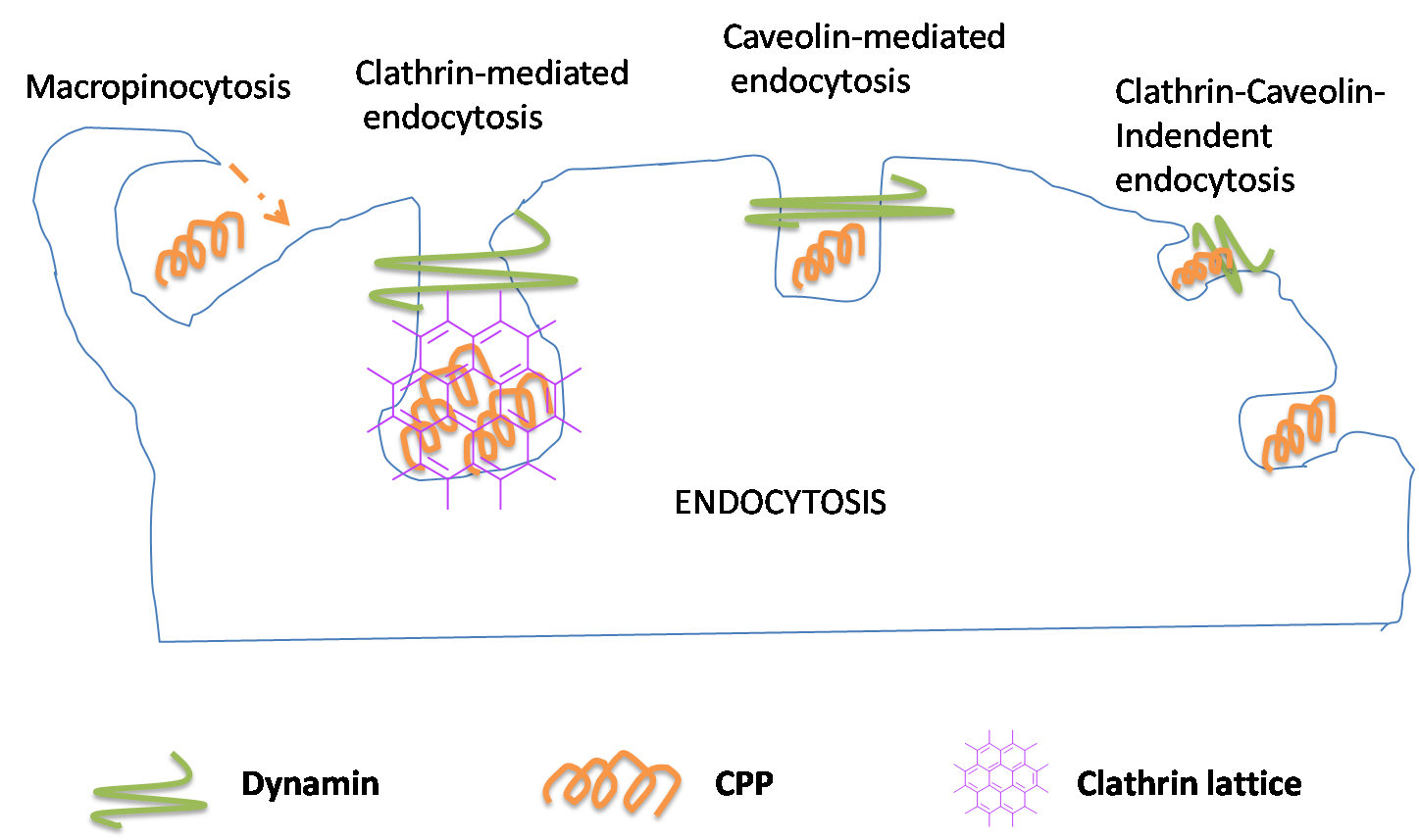
Schematic representation of molecular translocation via endocytosis. The second representation from the left illustrates the endocytotic mechanism involving clathrin-coated pits.

Pore formation following ultrasound application was first reported in 1999 in a study that observed cell membrane craters following ultrasound application at 255 kHz. Later, sonoporation mediated microinjection of dextran molecules showed that membrane permeability mechanisms differ depending on the size of dextran molecules. Microinjection of dextran molecules from 3 to 70 kDa was reported to have crossed the cellular membrane via transient pores. In contrast, dextran molecules of 155 and 500 kDa were predominantly found in vesicle-like structures, likely indicating the mechanism of endocytosis. This variability in membrane behavior has led to other studies investigating membrane rupture and resealing characteristics depending on ultrasound amplitude and duration.

=== Endocytosis ===
Various cellular reactions to ultrasound indicate the mechanism of molecular uptake via endocytosis. These observed reactionary phenomena include ion exchange, hydrogen peroxide, and cell intracellular calcium concentration. Studies have used patch clamping techniques to monitor membrane potential ion exchange for the role of endocytosis in sonoporation. Ultrasound application to cells and adjacent microbubbles was shown to produce marked cell membrane hyperpolarization along with progressive intracellular calcium increase, which is believed to be a consequence of calcium channels opening in response to microbubble oscillations. These findings act as support for ultrasound application inducing calcium-mediated uncoating of clathrin-coated pits seen in traditional endocytosis pathways. Other work reported sonoporation induced the formation of hydrogen peroxide, a cellular reaction that is also known to be involved with endocytosis.

=== Membrane wounds ===
Mechanically created wounds in the plasma membrane have been observed as a result of sonoporation-produced shear forces. The nature of these wounds may vary based on the degree of acoustic cavitation leading to a spectrum of cell behavior, from membrane blebbing to instant cell lysis. Multiple studies examining membrane wounds note observing resealing behavior, a process dependent on recruitment of ATP and intracellular vesicles.

=== Membrane resealing ===
Following sonoporation-mediated membrane permeabilization, cells can automatically repair the membrane openings through a phenomenon called "reparable sonoporation." The membrane resealing process has been shown to be calcium-dependent. This property may suggest that the membrane repair process involves a cell's active repair mechanism in response to the cellular influx of calcium.

== Preclinical studies ==
A study showing verified preclinical efficacy of acoustic targeted drug delivery.

=== In vitro ===
The first study reporting molecular delivery using ultrasound was a 1987 in vitro study attempting to transfer plasmid DNA to cultured mouse fibroblast cells using sonoporation. This successful plasmid DNA transfection conferring G418 antibiotic resistance ultimately led to further in vitro studies that hinted at the potential for sonoporation transfection of plasmid DNA and siRNA in vivo.

=== In vivo ===
In vivo ultrasound mediated drug delivery was first reported in 1991 and many other preclinical studies involving sonoporation have followed. This method is being used to deliver therapeutic drugs or genes to treat a variety of diseases including: Stroke, Cancer, Parkinson's, Alzheimer's... The preclinical utility of sonoporation is well illustrated through past tumor radiation treatments which have reported a more than 10-fold cellular destruction when ionizing radiation is coupled with ultrasound-mediated microbubble vascular disruption. This increase in delivery efficiency could allow for the appropriate reduction in therapeutic dosing.
