= Electrochemotherapy =

- Specialty: Oncology

Electrochemotherapy (ECT) is a type of chemotherapy that allows delivery of non-permeant drugs to the cell interior. It is based on the local application of short and intense electric pulses that transiently permeabilize the cell membrane, thus allowing transport of molecules otherwise not permitted by the membrane. Applications for treatment of cutaneous and subcutaneous tumors have reached clinical use by utilizing drugs such as bleomycin or cisplatin). Electrochemotherapy with bleomycin was used to treat a patient for the first time in 1991 at the Institute Gustave Roussy in France, while electrochemotherapy with cisplatin was used to treat for the first time in 1995 at the Institute of Oncology, Ljubljana, Slovenia. Since then, more than 4000 patients were treated with electrochemotherapy all over the world (Argentina, Australia, Austria, Belgium, Bulgaria, Denmark, France, Germany, Greece, Hungary, Ireland, Italy, Japan, Mexico, Nicaragua, Poland, Portugal, Slovenia, Spain, Sweden, UK, USA). Recently, new electrochemotherapy modalities have been developed for treatment of internal tumors using surgical procedures, endoscopic routes, or percutaneous approaches to gain access to the treatment area.

== Physical principle ==
Basic steps in electrochemotherapy treatment

When a biological cell is exposed to an electric field of sufficient strength, an increase in the transmembrane voltage is generated, which leads to rearrangements of the cell membrane structure. These changes result in an increase of the cell membrane permeability, which allows nonpermeant molecules to enter the cell. This phenomenon is called electroporation (or electropermeabilization) and is becoming widely used to improve anticancer drug delivery into cells, which is being referred to as electrochemotherapy.

All biomedical applications of cell electropermeabilization use direct currents (all unipolar) with short and intense pulses (even though in vitro, time-decayed pulses can be used). Amplitude of the pulses depends on the tissues and on the shape and position of the electrodes, but, in vivo, in the case of the tumors, the amplitude of the electric pulses has to be high enough to establish an electrical field of 400 V/cm in the area of tumor (8 pulses with duration of 100 microseconds). The duration of pulses is usually one hundred microseconds. In early experiments, pulses were delivered with period of 1 second (i.e. at a repetition frequency of 1 Hz); today, pulses are delivered in a much shorter time period, at a repetition frequency of 5000 Hz, resulting in a much less discomfort for the patient and in the shorter duration of treatment. For treatment of deep-seated tumors in relative vicinity of the heart, pulses are synchronized with absolute refractory period of each heartbeat to minimize the probability of interaction of pulses with the heart function.

== Treatment ==
Left: plate electrodes; Right: needle electrodes

The electrochemotherapeutic treatment consists of delivering, either systemically or locally, non-permeant cytotoxic drugs (e.g. bleomycin) or low-permeant drugs (e.g. cisplatin) and applying electric pulses to the area to be treated when the concentration of the drug in the tumor is at its peak. With the delivery of the electric pulses, cells are subjected to an electric field that causes the formation of nanoscale defects on the cell membrane, which alter the permeability of the membrane. At this stage and for some time after pulses are delivered, molecules of the cytotoxic agents can freely diffuse into the cytoplasm and exert their cytotoxic effect. Multiple positioning of the electrodes, and subsequent pulse delivery, can be performed during a session to treat the whole lesion, provided that drug concentration is sufficient. Treatment can be repeated over the course of weeks or months to achieve regression of large lesions.

== Application ==
Electrochemotherapy (ECT) is currently primarily used for the treatment of skin cancers, such as basal cell carcinoma, squamous cell carcinoma, melanoma, and Kaposi's sarcoma, an area in which its use is increasing. Additionally, ECT is uniquely employed by a clinic in Germany for the treatment of prostate cancer, often in combination with Irreversible Electroporation (IRE).

== Efficacy and clinical relevance ==
In a number of clinical studies (phase II and phase III), investigators have concluded that electrochemotherapy of cutaneous or subcutaneous metastasis or tumours with bleomycin and cisplatin have an objective response rate of more than 80%. Reduction of tumor size has been achieved with electrochemotherapy faster and more efficiently than in standard chemotherapy for both cutaneous and subcutaneous tumors. Patients with skin metastasis from melanoma, Kaposi sarcoma, squamous cell carcinoma, basal cell carcinoma, adenocarcinoma, or breast cancer have been successfully treated. First clinical results of electrochemotherapy of internal tumors (e.g. liver metastases) are also promising and encouraging. The success rate for electrochemotherapy in "human malignancies" has been stated to be more than 80% provided that a proper patient selection criteria will be performed.

== Safety ==
Electrochemotherapy employs lower dosages of chemotherapeutic drugs than standard chemotherapy protocols; thus, the patient's burden usually associated to chemotherapy is not present. In the clinical use of electrochemotherapy, limited side effects related to bleomycin or cisplatin use are recorded. Provided that appropriate anesthesia is used for alleviation of the symptoms associated with application of electric pulses, the control of the pain level during the electrochemotherapy is acceptable for the patients. Other than pain, which is limited to the treated tumor and surrounding tissue, muscle contraction during electric pulse delivery is the only other discomfort. There is also induction of a vascular lock by the type of pulses used in electrochemotherapy: for a few minutes, blood flow is interrupted in the treated volume in the normal tissues. Its duration is too short to induce deleterious effects due to ischemia. In tumors however, vascular lock is of a longer duration and can contribute to the effectiveness of the electrochemotherapy.

== Veterinary use ==
Electrochemotherapy is also used in veterinary oncology for a variety of tumors in dogs, cats, horses, and rabbits. There are centers in Argentina, Brazil, Chile, Uruguay, Paraguay, Mexico, Peru, Bolivia, Colombia, Ecuador, Republica Dominicana, Spain, France, Italy, Ireland, Slovenia, United Arab Emirates, and the UK,. There are now multiple institutions in the US including Maine, New York, Rhode Island, Washington, Missouri, South Carolina, Hawaii, Las Vegas, Florida, Virginia, and the Bay Area of Northern California where this treatment is available.

The success rate for electrochemotherapy has been stated to be around 90%, with an average of 3-4 treatments in the case of rabbits.

== See also ==
- Cancer
- Chemotherapy
- Electricity
