= Genosome =

Lipid and DNA complex used to deliver genes

A genosome (also known as a lipoplex) is a lipid and DNA complex that is used to deliver genes. It can be a form of non-viral gene therapy as the complex does not require any components of a virus in order to transport genetic material. In presence of CT-DNA, genosomes can form through surface electrostatic interaction.

== See also ==
- Vectors in gene therapy § Lipoplexes
