= Protofection =

Form of protein-mediated transfection

Protofection is a protein-mediated transfection of foreign mitochondrial DNA (mtDNA) into the mitochondria of cells in a tissue to supplement or replace the native mitochondrial DNA already present. The complete mtDNA genome or just fragments of mtDNA generated by polymerase chain reaction can be transferred into the target mitochondria through the technique.

Scientists have hypothesized for the last couple of decades that protofection can be beneficial for patients with mitochondrial diseases. This technique is a recent development and is continuously being improved. As mitochondrial DNA becomes progressively more damaged with age, this may provide a method of at least partially rejuvenating mitochondria in old tissue, restoring them to their original, youthful function.

== Method ==
Protofection is a developing technique and is continuously being improved. A specific protein transduction system has been created that is complexed with mtDNA, which enables the mtDNA to move across the targeted cell's membrane and specifically target mitochondria. The transduction system used consists of a protein transduction domain, mitochondrial localization sequences, and mitochondrial transcription factor A. Each of these play a specific role in protofection:

- A protein transduction domain is needed because they are small regions of proteins that can cross the cell membrane of cells, independently.
- A specific mitochondrial localization sequences is used for protofection because it permits mtDNA to enter the mitochondria.
- Mitochondrial transcription factor A is used because it unwinds the mtDNA that enters the mitochondria, which is critical for mtDNA replication.

This process can lead to an increase in the amount of mtDNA present in the mitochondria of the target cells.

The transduction system has been tweaked and modified, since the first use of protofection. To shorten the name of the complex, which was previously called PTD-MLS-TFAM complex, it is now named MTD-TFAM. MTD stands for mitochondrial transduction domain and it includes the protein transduction domain and the mitochondrial localization sequences.

== Possible therapeutic uses ==
One hypothesis for mitochondrial diseases is that mitochondrial damage and dysfunction play an important role in aging. Protofection is being researched as a possibly viable laboratory technique for constructing gene therapies for inherited mitochondrial diseases, such as Leber's hereditary optic neuropathy. Studies have shown that protofection can lead to improved mitochondrial function in targeted cells.

Protofection could be applied to modified or artificial mitochondria. Mitochondria could be modified to produce few or no free radicals without compromising energy production. Recent studies have demonstrated that mitochondrial transplants may be useful to rejuvenate dead or dying tissue, such as in heart attacks, for which the mitochondria is the first part of the cell that dies.
