= Cationic liposome =

Structures containing lipids

Cationic liposomes are spherical structures that contain positively charged lipids. Cationic liposomes can vary in size between 40 nm and 500 nm, and they can either have one lipid bilayer (monolamellar) or multiple lipid bilayers (multilamellar). The positive charge of the phospholipids allows cationic liposomes to form complexes with negatively charged nucleic acids (DNA, mRNA, and siRNA) through ionic interactions. Upon interacting with nucleic acids, cationic liposomes form clusters of aggregated vesicles. These interactions allow cationic liposomes to condense and encapsulate various therapeutic and diagnostic agents in their aqueous compartment or in their lipid bilayer. These cationic liposome-nucleic acid complexes are also referred to as lipoplexes. Due to the overall positive charge of cationic liposomes, they interact with negatively charged cell membranes more readily than classic liposomes. This positive charge can also create some issues in vivo, such as binding to plasma proteins in the bloodstream, which leads to opsonization. These issues can be reduced by optimizing the physical and chemical properties of cationic liposomes through their lipid composition. Cationic liposomes are increasingly being researched for use as delivery vectors in gene therapy due to their capability to efficiently transfect cells. A common application for cationic liposomes is cancer drug delivery.

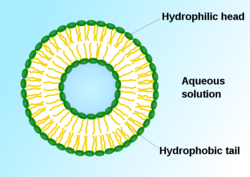
Schematic of a monolamellar liposome. The hydrophilic head of the phospholipid faces outwards while the hydrophobic tail faces inwards, forming a lipid bilayer.

== History ==
In the 1960s, Alec D. Bangham discovered liposomes as concentric lipid bilayers surrounding an aqueous center, based on his research at the University of Cambridge Babraham Institute. The first formulations were designed using all natural lipids. In 1987, Philip Felgner published the first approach to using cationic lipids to transfect DNA into cells, based on his research into cationic lipids at Syntex from 1982 to 1988. Felgner introduced the first cationic lipid used for gene delivery, N-[1-(2,3-dioleyloxy)propyl]-N,N,N-trimethylammonium chloride (DOTMA).

== Composition ==
The use of cationic lipids helps to enhance the overall stability and efficiency of liposomes. Although cationic lipids themselves are able to encapsulate nucleic acids into liposomes, the transfection efficiency is low due to a process known as endosomal escape. Lipids that are capable of destabilizing endosomal membranes and facilitating endosomal escape are known as fusogenic lipids. The addition of helper lipids to the cationic lipids demonstrates a much higher transfection efficiency.

Cationic liposomes with a higher transfection efficiency are composed of a cationic phospholipid, and a few neutral helper lipids. A commonly used cationic phospholipid is DOTMA, and a commonly used fusogenic helper lipid is dioleoyl phosphatidylethanolamine (DOPE). A couple of commonly used neutral helper lipids are cholesterol and polyethylene glycol (PEG)-lipid. These components are all biocompatible and biodegradable in the human body, making cationic liposomes a useful gene delivery vector.

Because the phospholipids each have a hydrophobic tail and a hydrophilic head group, they are able to form a lipid bilayer with the hydrophilic heads facing outwards and the hydrophobic tails facing inwards. Adding DOPE in addition to DOTMA promotes the endosomal escape of nucleic acids into the cytosol when the cationic lipid is fused to an endosome membrane. The addition of cholesterol helps to stabilize the liposome and more efficiently encapsulate nucleic acids. Regulating the structure and flexibility of the lipid bilayer with cholesterol allows for a more dense assembly of phospholipids. The PEG-lipid binds to the outer surface of the liposome, acting as a protective layer and reducing the formation of a protein corona. The presence of PEG on the surface of the liposome drastically increases the blood circulation time of cationic liposomes.

== Manufacturing ==
Cationic liposomes are manufactured similarly to liposomes. There are multiple processes that can be used to form cationic liposomes, such as sonication, extrusion, and vortexing. However, the shear forces associated with these methods are capable of damaging the nucleic acids prior to encapsulation. Microfluidics is a field that is currently being looked into for the purpose of forming cationic liposomes without the shear forces and damage associated with current methods.

== Delivery Mechanism in vivo ==
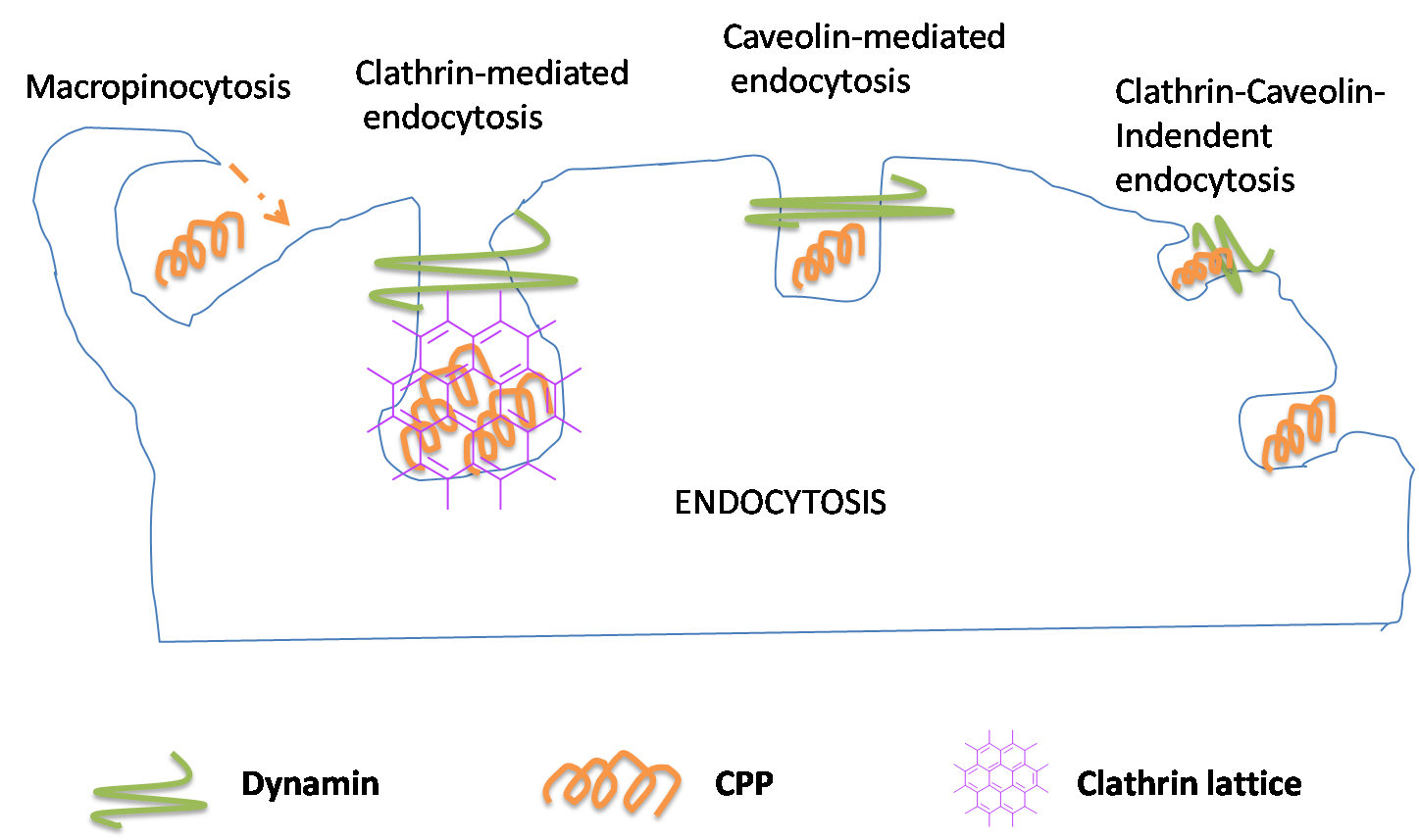
Mechanisms of CME, CavME, and macropinocytosis. These endocytic pathways are all common in the delivery of nucleic acids from lamellar cationic liposomes.

Cationic liposomes can deliver nucleic acids into the cell through an endocytotic pathway or through cell membrane fusion. Fusogenic cationic liposomes almost exclusively deliver nucleic acids through cell membrane fusion. The fusion between positively charged cationic liposomes and negatively charged cell surfaces efficiently delivers the DNA directly across the plasma membrane. This process bypasses the endosomal-lysosomal route, which leads to the degradation of anionic liposome formulations. Cationic liposomes in the lamellar phase deliver nucleic acids through endocytosis, specifically clathrin-mediated endocytosis (CME), caveolae-mediated endocytosis (CavME), and macropinocytosis.

After administration in vivo, cationic liposomes are biodegradable due to the presence of endogenous enzymes that can digest the lipids.

== Applications ==
=== Cancer drug delivery ===
==== EndoTAG-1 ====
Paclitaxel (PTX) is a chemotherapy medication used to treat many types of cancer, such as ovarian cancer, breast cancer, and pancreatic cancer. PTX works by inhibiting the growth of tumor endothelial cells, however it has in vivo delivery issues that are caused by its unfavorable pharmacokinetic and physical properties. Studies have shown that some patients who take PTX experience adverse reactions, such as nephrotoxicity and neurotoxicity.

SynCore Bio's EndoTAG-1 is a cationic liposome formulation with embedded PTX. The cationic lipid used in this formulation is dioleoyloxypropyltrimethylammonium (DOTAP). The PTX-embedded cationic liposome interacts with the negatively charged tumor endothelial cells required for tumor angiogenesis, in order to reduce their tumor blood supply. Through this mechanism, EndoTAG-1 is able to prevent angiogenesis in the tumor, which in turn inhibits tumor growth. EndoTAG-1 is currently under phase III clinical trial investigation, and is specifically targeting adenocarcinoma of the pancreas when used in combination with gemcitabine.

== Issues in vivo ==
=== Cytotoxicity ===
The positive charge of cationic lipids has been shown to have cytotoxic effects, as these lipids can activate several pro-apoptotic and pro-inflammatory cell signaling pathways. The cationic nature of these lipids is associated with the structure of the head group. In particular, it was found that the quaternary ammonium head groups of some cationic lipids (e.g., DOTMA) are more cytotoxic than the peptide head groups of other cationic lipids. This cytotoxic effect can be reduced by the addition of PEG on the surface of the cationic liposome.

=== Opsonization ===
If delivered through intravenous administration, cationic liposomes can result in opsonization, which is an immune response that occurs when opsonins tag foreign pathogens to be eliminated through phagocytosis. Due to their positive charge, cationic liposomes bind to various plasma proteins, forming a protein corona on their surface and completely changing their biological identity. This new biological identity then causes opsonins to tag them as pathogens and encourages clearance through phagocytic clearance.

== See also ==
- Liposome
- Solid lipid nanoparticle
- Cationic polymerization
- Gene therapy
- Lipofection
- Phospholipid
