= Tail vein =

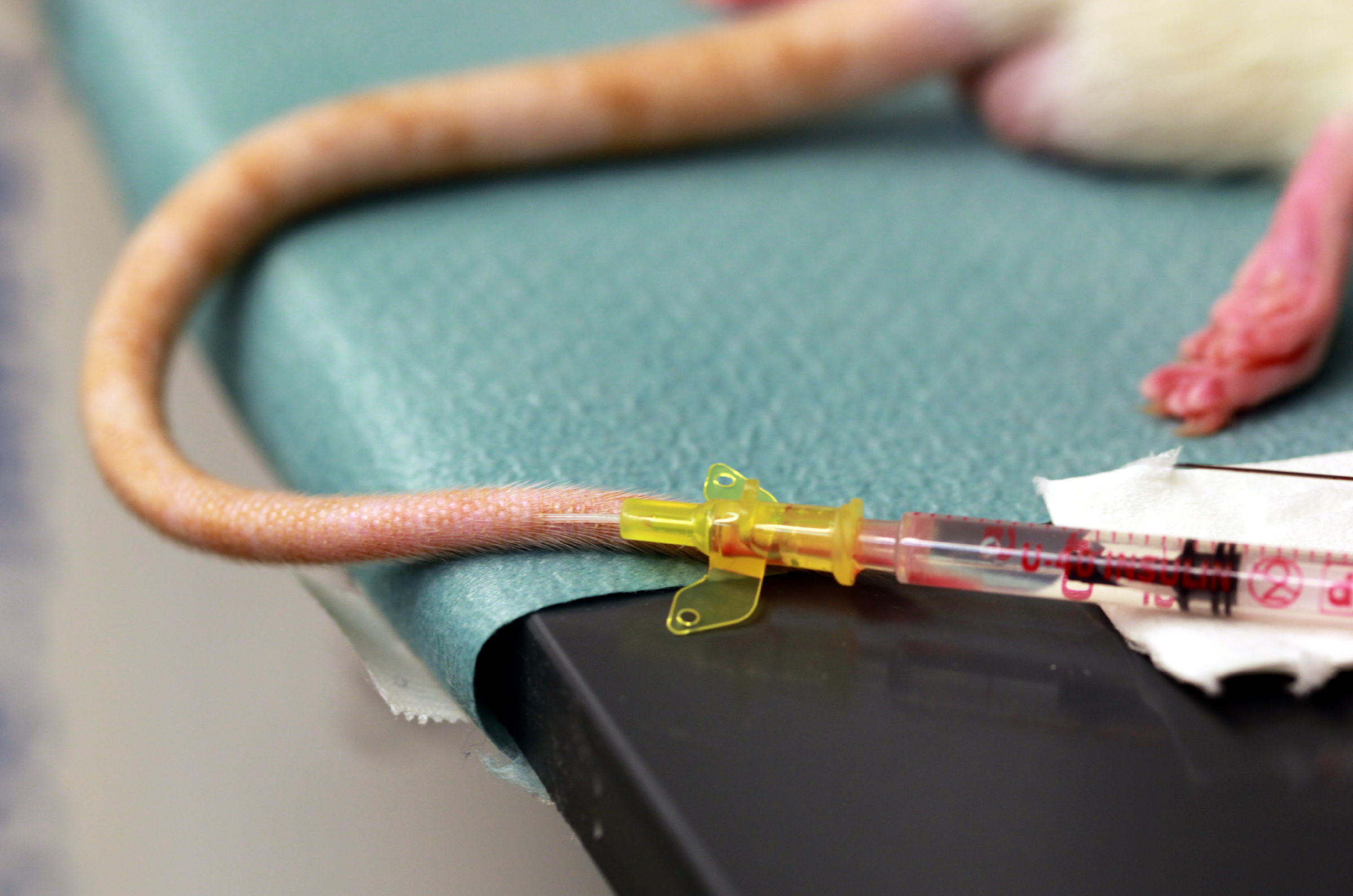
Injection into the tail vein of a rat

The tail vein or caudal vein is the largest vein in the tail of a vertebrate animal. It leads directly into the posterior cardinal vein of the posterior trunk in fishes. The mammal caudal vein (the middle caudal vein) leads to the inferior vena cava.

The caudal vein is one of the many places from which a laboratory worker can withdraw blood from a mouse specimen. The process does not require the death of the mouse, assuming that it does not exceed the established standard that "no more than two blood samples are taken per session and in any one 24-hour period...The lateral tail vein is usually used and 50 μl to 0.2 ml of blood can be obtained per sample depending on the size of the animal."

Warming an animal to the ideal 39°C may be necessary to cause dilation of the veins and allow for easier processing.
