= Transfection =

Process of introducing nucleic acids into eukaryotic cells

Transfection is the process of deliberately introducing naked or purified nucleic acids into eukaryotic cells. It may also refer to other methods and cell types, although other terms are often preferred: "transformation" is typically used to describe non-viral DNA transfer in bacteria and non-animal eukaryotic cells, including plant cells. In animal cells, transfection is the preferred term, as the term "transformation" is also used to refer to a cell's progression to a cancerous state (carcinogenesis). Transduction is often used to describe virus-mediated gene transfer into prokaryotic cells.

The word transfection is a portmanteau of the prefix trans- and the word "infection." Genetic material (such as supercoiled plasmid DNA or siRNA constructs), may be transfected. Transfection of animal cells typically involves opening transient pores or "holes" in the cell membrane to allow the uptake of material. Transfection can be carried out using calcium phosphate (i.e. tricalcium phosphate), by electroporation, by cell squeezing, or by mixing a cationic lipid with the material to produce liposomes that fuse with the cell membrane and deposit their cargo inside.

Transfection can result in unexpected morphologies and abnormalities in target cells.

== Terminology ==
The meaning of the term has evolved. The original meaning of transfection was "infection by transformation", i.e., introduction of genetic material, DNA or RNA, from a prokaryote-infecting virus or bacteriophage into cells, resulting in an infection. For work with bacterial and archaeal cells transfection retains its original meaning as a special case of transformation. Because the term transformation had another sense in animal cell biology (a genetic change allowing long-term propagation in culture, or acquisition of properties typical of cancer cells), the term transfection acquired, for animal cells, its present meaning of a change in cell properties caused by introduction of DNA.

== Methods ==
There are various methods of introducing foreign DNA into a eukaryotic cell: some rely on physical treatment (electroporation, cell squeezing, nanoparticles, magnetofection); others rely on chemical materials or biological particles (viruses) that are used as carriers. There are many different methods of gene delivery developed for various types of cells and tissues, from bacterial to mammalian. Generally, the methods can be divided into three categories: physical, chemical, and biological.

Physical methods include electroporation, microinjection, gene gun, impalefection, hydrostatic pressure, continuous infusion, and sonication. Chemicals include methods such as lipofection, which is a lipid-mediated DNA-transfection process utilizing liposome vectors. It can also include the use of polymeric gene carriers (polyplexes). Biological transfection is typically mediated by viruses, utilizing the ability of a virus to inject its DNA inside a host cell. A gene that is intended for delivery is packaged into a replication-deficient viral particle. Viruses used to date include retrovirus, lentivirus, adenovirus, adeno-associated virus, and herpes simplex virus.

=== Physical methods ===
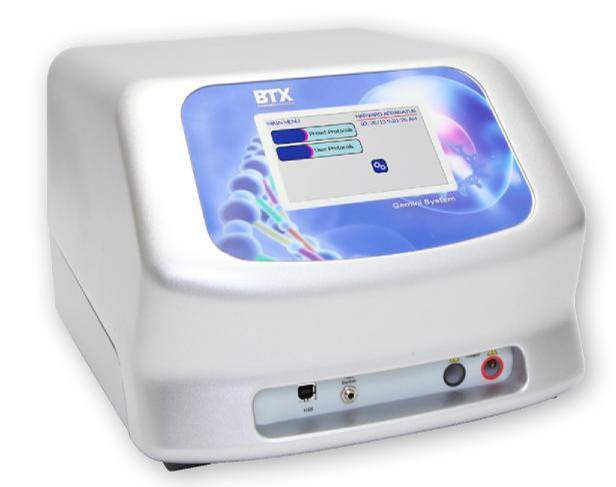
Electroporator with square wave and exponential decay waveforms for in vitro, in vivo, adherent cell and 96 well electroporation applications. Manufactured by BTX Harvard Apparatus, Holliston MA USA.

Physical methods are the conceptually simplest, using some physical means to force the transfected material into the target cell's nucleus. The most widely used physical method is electroporation, where short electrical pulses disrupt the cell membrane, allowing the transfected nucleic acids to enter the cell. Other physical methods use different means to poke holes in the cell membrane: Sonoporation uses high-intensity ultrasound (attributed mainly to the cavitation of gas bubbles interacting with nearby cell membranes), optical transfection uses a highly focused laser to form a ~1 μm diameter hole.

Several methods use tools that force the nucleic acid into the cell, namely: microinjection of nucleic acid with a fine needle; biolistic particle delivery, in which nucleic acid is attached to heavy metal particles (usually gold) and propelled into the cells at high speed; and magnetofection, where nucleic acids are attached to magnetic iron oxide particles and driven into the target cells by magnets.

Hydrodynamic delivery is a method used in mice and rats, in which nucleic acids can be delivered to the liver by injecting a relatively large volume in the blood in less than 10 seconds; nearly all of the DNA is expressed in the liver by this procedure.

=== Chemical methods ===
Chemical-based transfection can be divided into several kinds: cyclodextrin, polymers, liposomes, or nanoparticles (with or without chemical or viral functionalization. See below).

- One of the cheapest methods uses calcium phosphate, originally discovered by F. L. Graham and A. J. van der Eb in 1973 (see also). HEPES-buffered saline solution (HeBS) containing phosphate ions is combined with a calcium chloride solution containing the DNA to be transfected. When the two are combined, a fine precipitate of the positively charged calcium and the negatively charged phosphate will form, binding the DNA to be transfected on its surface. The suspension of the precipitate is then added to the cells to be transfected (usually a cell culture grown in a monolayer). By a process not entirely understood, the cells take up some of the precipitate, and with it, the DNA. This process has been a preferred method of identifying many oncogenes.
- Another method is the use of cationic polymers such as DEAE-dextran or polyethylenimine (PEI). The negatively charged DNA binds to the polycation and the complex is taken up by the cell via endocytosis.
- Lipofection (or liposome transfection) is a technique used to inject genetic material into a cell by means of liposomes, which are vesicles that can easily merge with the cell membrane since they are both made of a phospholipid bilayer. Lipofection generally uses a positively charged (cationic) lipid (cationic liposomes or mixtures) to form an aggregate with the negatively charged (anionic) genetic material. This transfection technology performs the same tasks as other biochemical procedures utilizing polymers, DEAE-dextran, calcium phosphate, and electroporation. The efficiency of lipofection can be improved by treating transfected cells with a mild heat shock.
- Fugene is a series of widely used proprietary non-liposomal transfection reagents capable of directly transfecting a wide variety of cells with high efficiency and low toxicity.
- Dendrimer is a class of highly branched molecules based on various building blocks and synthesized through a convergent or a divergent method. These dendrimers bind the nucleic acids to form dendriplexes that then penetrate the cells.

=== Viral methods ===
DNA can also be introduced into cells using viruses as a carrier. In such cases, the technique is called transduction, and the cells are said to be transduced. Adenoviral vectors can be useful for viral transfection methods because they can transfer genes into a wide variety of human cells and have high transfer rates. Lentiviral vectors are also helpful due to their ability to transduce cells not currently undergoing mitosis.

Protoplast fusion is a technique in which transformed bacterial cells are treated with lysozyme in order to remove the cell wall. Following this, fusogenic agents (e.g., Sendai virus, PEG, electroporation) are used in order to fuse the protoplast carrying the gene of interest with the target recipient cell. A major disadvantage of this method is that bacterial components are non-specifically introduced into the target cell as well.

== Stable and transient transfection ==
Stable and transient transfection differ in their long term effects on a cell; a stably transfected cell will continuously express transfected DNA and pass it on to daughter cells, while a transiently transfected cell will express transfected DNA for a short amount of time and not pass it on to daughter cells.

For some applications of transfection, it is sufficient if the transfected genetic material is only transiently expressed. Since the DNA introduced in the transfection process is usually not integrated into the nuclear genome, the foreign DNA will be diluted through mitosis or degraded. Cell lines expressing the Epstein–Barr virus (EBV) nuclear antigen 1 (EBNA1) or the SV40 large-T antigen allow episomal amplification of plasmids containing the viral EBV (293E) or SV40 (293T) origins of replication, greatly reducing the rate of dilution.

If it is desired that the transfected gene actually remain in the genome of the cell and its daughter cells, a stable transfection must occur. To accomplish this, a marker gene is co-transfected, which gives the cell some selectable advantage, such as resistance towards a certain toxin. Some (very few) of the transfected cells will, by chance, have integrated the foreign genetic material into their genome. If the toxin is then added to the cell culture, only those few cells with the marker gene integrated into their genomes will be able to proliferate, while other cells will die. After applying this selective stress (selection pressure) for some time, only the cells with a stable transfection remain and can be cultivated further.

Common agents for selecting stable transfection
Agent	Selectable marker
Geneticin (G418)	neomycin resistance gene NeoR
Puromycin	Puromycin N-acetyltransferase (PURO)
Zeocin	Sh Ble
Hygromycin B	Hygromycin resistance gene Hph
Blasticidin S	At Bsd or Bc Bsr

== RNA transfection ==
RNA can also be transfected into cells to transiently express its coded protein, or to study RNA decay kinetics. RNA transfection is often used in primary cells that do not divide.

siRNAs can also be transfected to achieve RNA silencing (i.e. loss of RNA and protein from the targeted gene). This has become a major application in research to achieve "knock-down" of proteins of interests (e.g. Endothelin-1) with potential applications in gene therapy. Limitation of the silencing approach are the toxicity of the transfection for cells and potential "off-target" effects on the expression of other genes/proteins.

RNA can be purified from cells after lysis or synthesized from free nucleotides either chemically, or enzymatically using an RNA polymerase to transcribe a DNA template. As with DNA, RNA can be delivered to cells by a variety of means including microinjection, electroporation, and lipid-mediated transfection. If the RNA encodes a protein, transfected cells may translate the RNA into the encoded protein. If the RNA is a regulatory RNA (such as a miRNA), the RNA may cause other changes in the cell (such as RNAi-mediated knockdown).

Encapsulating the RNA molecule in lipid nanoparticles was a breakthrough for producing viable RNA vaccines, solving a number of key technical barriers in delivering the RNA molecule into the human cell.

RNA molecules shorter than about 25nt (nucleotides) largely evade detection by the innate immune system, which is triggered by longer RNA molecules. Most cells of the body express proteins of the innate immune system, and upon exposure to exogenous long RNA molecules, these proteins initiate signaling cascades that result in inflammation. This inflammation hypersensitizes the exposed cell and nearby cells to subsequent exposure. As a result, while a cell can be repeatedly transfected with short RNA with few non-specific effects, repeatedly transfecting cells with even a small amount of long RNA can cause cell death unless measures are taken to suppress or evade the innate immune system (see "Long-RNA transfection" below).

Short-RNA transfection is routinely used in biological research to knock down the expression of a protein of interest (using siRNA) or to express or block the activity of a miRNA (using short RNA that acts independently of the cell's RNAi machinery, and therefore is not referred to as siRNA). While DNA-based vectors (viruses, plasmids) that encode a short RNA molecule can also be used, short-RNA transfection does not risk modification of the cell's DNA, a characteristic that has led to the development of short RNA as a new class of macromolecular drugs.

Long-RNA transfection is the process of deliberately introducing RNA molecules longer than about 25nt into living cells. A distinction is made between short- and long-RNA transfection because exogenous long RNA molecules elicit an innate immune response in cells that can cause a variety of nonspecific effects including translation block, cell-cycle arrest, and apoptosis.

=== Endogenous vs. exogenous long RNA ===
The innate immune system has evolved to protect against infection by detecting pathogen-associated molecular patterns (PAMPs), and triggering a complex set of responses collectively known as inflammation. Many cells express specific pattern recognition receptors (PRRs) for exogenous RNA including toll-like receptor 3,7,8 (TLR3, TLR7, TLR8), the RNA helicase RIG1 (RARRES3), protein kinase R (PKR, a.k.a. EIF2AK2), members of the oligoadenylate synthetase family of proteins (OAS1, OAS2, OAS3), and others. All of these proteins can specifically bind to exogenous RNA molecules and trigger an immune response. The specific chemical, structural or other characteristics of long RNA molecules that are required for recognition by PRRs remain largely unknown despite intense study. At any given time, a typical mammalian cell may contain several hundred thousand mRNA and other, regulatory long RNA molecules. How cells distinguish exogenous long RNA from the large amount of endogenous long RNA is an important open question in cell biology. Several reports suggest that phosphorylation of the 5'-end of a long RNA molecule can influence its immunogenicity, and specifically that 5'-triphosphate RNA, which can be produced during viral infection, is more immunogenic than 5'-diphosphate RNA, 5'-monophosphate RNA or RNA containing no 5' phosphate. However, in vitro-transcribed (ivT) long RNA containing a 7-methylguanosine cap (present in eukaryotic mRNA) is also highly immunogenic despite having no 5' phosphate, suggesting that characteristics other than 5'-phosphorylation can influence the immunogenicity of an RNA molecule.

Eukaryotic mRNA contains chemically modified nucleotides such as N^{6}-methyladenosine, 5-methylcytidine, and 2'-O-methylated nucleotides. Although only a very small number of these modified nucleotides are present in a typical mRNA molecule, they may help prevent mRNA from activating the innate immune system by disrupting secondary structure that would resemble double-stranded RNA (dsRNA), a type of RNA thought to be present in cells only during viral infection. The immunogenicity of long RNA has been used to study both innate and adaptive immunity.

=== Repeated long-RNA transfection ===
Inhibiting only three proteins, interferon-β, STAT2, and EIF2AK2 is sufficient to rescue human fibroblasts from the cell death caused by frequent transfection with long, protein-encoding RNA. Inhibiting interferon signaling disrupts the positive-feedback loop that normally hypersensitizes cells exposed to exogenous long RNA. Researchers have recently used this technique to express reprogramming proteins in primary human fibroblasts.

== See also ==
- Gene targeting
- Minicircle
- Protofection
- Transformation
- Transduction
- Transgene
- Vector (molecular biology)
- Viral vector
