= Microinjection =

Injection of very small amounts of fluid

Microinjection of a fluorescent dye into Ciona intestinalis eggs positioned in a microwell array.

Microinjection is the use of a glass micropipette to inject a liquid substance at a microscopic or borderline macroscopic level. The target is often a living cell but may also include intercellular space. Microinjection is a simple mechanical process usually involving an inverted microscope with a magnification power of around 200x (though sometimes it is performed using a dissecting stereo microscope at 40–50x or a traditional compound upright microscope at similar power to an inverted model).

For processes such as cellular or pronuclear injection the target cell is positioned under the microscope and two micromanipulators—one holding the pipette and one holding a microcapillary needle usually between 0.5 and 5 μm in diameter (larger if injecting stem cells into an embryo)—are used to penetrate the cell membrane and/or the nuclear envelope. In this way the process can be used to introduce a vector into a single cell. Microinjection can also be used in the cloning of organisms, in the study of cell biology and viruses, and for treating male subfertility through intracytoplasmic sperm injection (ICSI, /ˈɪksi/ IK-see).

== History ==
The use of microinjection as a biological procedure began in the early twentieth century, although even through the 1970s it was not commonly used. By the 1990s, its use had escalated significantly and it is now considered a common laboratory technique, along with vesicle fusion, electroporation, chemical transfection, and viral transduction, for introducing a small amount of a substance into a small target.

== Basic types ==
There are two basic types of microinjection systems. The first is called a constant flow system and the second is called a pulsed flow system. In a constant flow system, which is relatively simple and inexpensive though clumsy and outdated, a constant flow of a sample is delivered from a micropipette and the amount of the sample which is injected is determined by how long the needle remains in the cell. This system typically requires a regulated pressure source, a capillary holder, and either a coarse or a fine micromanipulator. A pulsed flow system, however, allows for greater control and consistency over the amount of sample injected: the most common arrangement for intracytoplasmic sperm injection includes an Eppendorf "Femtojet" injector coupled with an Eppendorf "InjectMan", though procedures involving other targets usually take advantage of much less expensive equipment of similar capability. Because of its increased control over needle placement and movement and in addition to the increased precision over the volume of substance delivered, the pulsed flow technique usually results in less damage to the receiving cell than the constant flow technique. However, the Eppendorf line, at least, has a complex user interface and its particular system components are usually much more expensive than those necessary to create a constant flow system or than other pulsed flow injection systems.

== Pronuclear injection ==
Diagram of the intracytoplasmic sperm injection of a human egg. Micromanipulator on the left holds egg in position while microinjector on the right delivers a single sperm cell.

Pronuclear injection is a technique used to create transgenic organisms by injecting genetic material into the nucleus of a fertilized oocyte. This technique is commonly used to study the role of genes using mouse animal models.

=== Pronuclear injection in mice ===
The pronuclear injection of mouse sperm is one of the two most common methods for producing transgenic animals (along with the genetic engineering of embryonic stem cells). In order for pronuclear injection to be successful, the genetic material (typically linear DNA) must be injected while the genetic material from the oocyte and sperm are separate (i.e., the pronuclear phase). In order to obtain these oocytes, mice are commonly superovulated using gonadotrophins. Once plugging has occurred, oocytes are harvested from the mouse and injected with the genetic material. The oocyte is then implanted in the oviduct of a pseudopregnant animal. While efficiency varies, 10-40% of mice born from these implanted oocytes may contain the injected construct. Transgenic mice can then be bred to create transgenic lines.

== See also ==
- Transgenesis
- Genetically modified mouse
- Biology: The Unity and Diversity of Life
- Nanoinjection
