= Gene gun =

Device used in genetic engineering

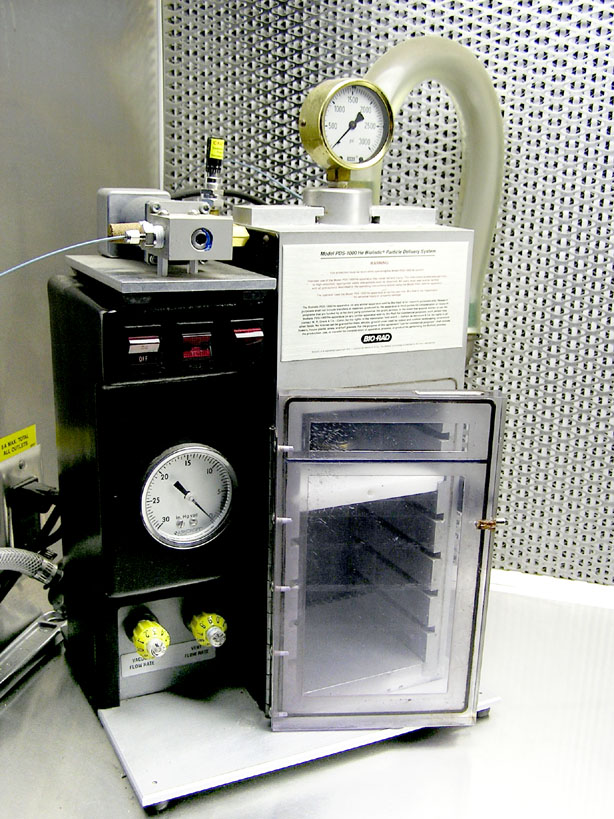
PDS-1000/He Particle Delivery System

In genetic engineering, a gene gun or biolistic particle delivery system is a device used to deliver exogenous DNA (transgenes), RNA, or protein to cells. By coating particles of a heavy metal with a gene of interest and firing these micro-projectiles into cells using mechanical force, an integration of desired genetic information can be introduced into desired cells. The technique involved with such micro-projectile delivery of DNA is often referred to as biolistics, short for "biological ballistics".

This device is able to transform almost any type of cell and is not limited to the transformation of the nucleus; it can also transform organelles, including plastids and mitochondria.

A gene gun is used for delivery of exogenous DNA to cells. This method is known as 'biolistics'. Gene guns can be used effectively on most cells but are mainly used on plant cells.: 1. The gene gun apparatus is ready to fire.; 2. Helium fills the chamber and pressure builds against the rupture disk.; 3. The pressure eventually reaches the point where the rupture disk breaks, and the resulting burst of helium propels the DNA/gold-coated macrocarrier ('Plastic Disk') into the stopping screen.; 4. When the macrocarrier hits the stopping screen, the DNA-coated gold particles are propelled through the screen and into the target cells.

== Gene gun design ==
The gene gun was originally a Crosman air pistol modified to fire dense tungsten particles. It was invented by John C Sanford, Ed Wolf, and Nelson Allen at Cornell University along with Ted Klein of DuPont between 1983 and 1986. The original target was onions (chosen for their large cell size), and the device was used to deliver particles coated with a marker gene which would relay a signal if proper insertion of the DNA transcript occurred. Genetic transformation was demonstrated upon observed expression of the marker gene within onion cells.

The earliest custom manufactured gene guns (fabricated by Nelson Allen) used a 22 caliber nail gun cartridge to propel a polyethylene cylinder (bullet) down a 22 caliber Douglas barrel. A droplet of the tungsten powder coated with genetic material was placed onto the bullet and shot down into a Petri dish below. The bullet welded to the disk below the Petri plate, and the genetic material blasted into the sample with a doughnut effect involving devastation in the middle of the sample with a ring of good transformation around the periphery. The gun was connected to a vacuum pump and was placed under a vacuum while firing. The early design was put into limited production by a Rumsey-Loomis (a local machine shop then at Mecklenburg Road in Ithaca, NY, USA).

Biolistics, Inc sold Dupont the rights to manufacture and distribute an updated device with improvements including the use of helium as a non-explosive propellant and a multi-disk collision delivery mechanism to minimize damage to sample tissues. Other heavy metals such as gold and silver are also used to deliver genetic material with gold being favored due to lower cytotoxicity in comparison to tungsten projectile carriers.

== Biolistic construct design ==
Biolistic transformation involves the integration of a functional fragment of DNA—known as a DNA construct—into target cells. A gene construct is a DNA cassette containing all required regulatory elements for proper expression within the target organism. While gene constructs may vary in their design depending on the desired outcome of the transformation procedure, all constructs typically contain a combination a promoter sequence, a terminator sequence, the gene of interest, and a reporter gene.

Promoter
Promoters control the location and magnitude of gene expression and function as "the steering wheel and gas pedal" of a gene. Promoters precede the gene of interest in the DNA construct and can be changed through laboratory design to fine-tune transgene expression. The 35S promoter from Cauliflower mosaic virus is an example of a commonly used promoter that results in robust constitutive gene expression within plants.
Terminator
Terminator sequences are required for proper gene expression and are placed after the coding region of the gene of interest within the DNA construct. A common terminator for biolistic transformation is the NOS terminator derived from Agrobacterium tumefaciens. Due to the high frequency of use of this terminator in genetically engineered plants, strategies have been developed to detect its presence within the food supply to monitor for unauthorized GE crops.
Reporter gene
A gene encoding a selectable marker is a common element within DNA constructs and is used to select for properly transformed cells. The selectable marker chosen will depend on the species being transformed, but it will typically be a gene granting cells a detoxification capacity for certain herbicides or antibiotics such as kanamycin, hygromycin B, or glyphosate.
Additional elements
Optional components of a DNA construct include elements such as cre-lox sequences that allow for controlled removal of the construct from the target genome. Such elements are chosen by the construct developer to perform specialized functions alongside the main gene of interest.

== Application ==
Gene guns are mostly used with plant cells. However, there is much potential use in humans and other animals as well.

=== Plants ===
The target of a gene gun is often a callus of undifferentiated plant cells or a group of immature embryos growing on gel medium in a Petri dish. After the DNA-coated gold particles have been delivered to the cells, the DNA is used as a template for transcription (transient expression) and sometimes it integrates into a plant chromosome ('stable' transformation)

If the delivered DNA construct contains a selectable marker, then stably transformed cells can be selected and cultured using tissue culture methods. For example, if the delivered DNA construct contains a gene that confers resistance to an antibiotic or herbicide, then stably transformed cells may be selected by including that antibiotic or herbicide in the tissue culture media.

Transformed cells can be treated with a series of plant hormones, such as auxins and gibberellins, and each may divide and differentiate into the organized, specialized, tissue cells of an entire plant. This capability of total re-generation is called totipotency. The new plant that originated from a successfully transformed cell may have new traits that are heritable. The use of the gene gun may be contrasted with the use of Agrobacterium tumefaciens and its Ti plasmid to insert DNA into plant cells. See transformation for different methods of transformation in different species.

=== Humans and other animals ===
Gene guns have also been used to deliver DNA vaccines.

The delivery of plasmids into rat neurons through the use of a gene gun, specifically DRG neurons, is also used as a pharmacological precursor in studying the effects of neurodegenerative diseases such as Alzheimer's disease.

The gene gun has become a common tool for labeling subsets of cells in cultured tissue. In addition to being able to transfect cells with DNA plasmids coding for fluorescent proteins, the gene gun can be adapted to deliver a wide variety of vital dyes to cells.

Gene gun bombardment has also been used to transform Caenorhabditis elegans, as an alternative to microinjection.

== Advantages ==
Biolistics has proven to be a versatile method of genetic modification and it is generally preferred to engineer transformation-resistant crops, such as cereals. Notably, Bt maize is a product of biolistics. Plastid transformation has also seen great success with particle bombardment when compared to other current techniques, such as Agrobacterium mediated transformation, which have difficulty targeting the vector to and stably expressing in the chloroplast. In addition, there are no reports of a chloroplast silencing a transgene inserted with a gene gun. Additionally, with only one firing of a gene gun, a skilled technician can generate two transformed organisms in certain species. This technology has even allowed for modification of specific tissues in situ, although this is likely to damage large numbers of cells and transform only some, rather than all, cells of the tissue.

== Limitations ==
Biolistics introduces DNA randomly into the target cells. Thus the DNA may be transformed into whatever genomes are present in the cell, be they nuclear, mitochondrial, plasmid or any others, in any combination, though proper construct design may mitigate this. The delivery and integration of multiple templates of the DNA construct is a distinct possibility, resulting in potential variable expression levels and copy numbers of the inserted gene. This is due to the ability of the constructs to give and take genetic material from other constructs, causing some to carry no transgene and others to carry multiple copies; the number of copies inserted depends on both how many copies of the transgene an inserted construct has, and how many were inserted. Also, because eukaryotic constructs rely on illegitimate recombination—a process by which the transgene is integrated into the genome without similar genetic sequences—and not homologous recombination, they cannot be targeted to specific locations within the genome, unless the transgene is co-delivered with genome editing reagents.
