= Electroporation =

Method in molecular biology to make pores in cell membranes

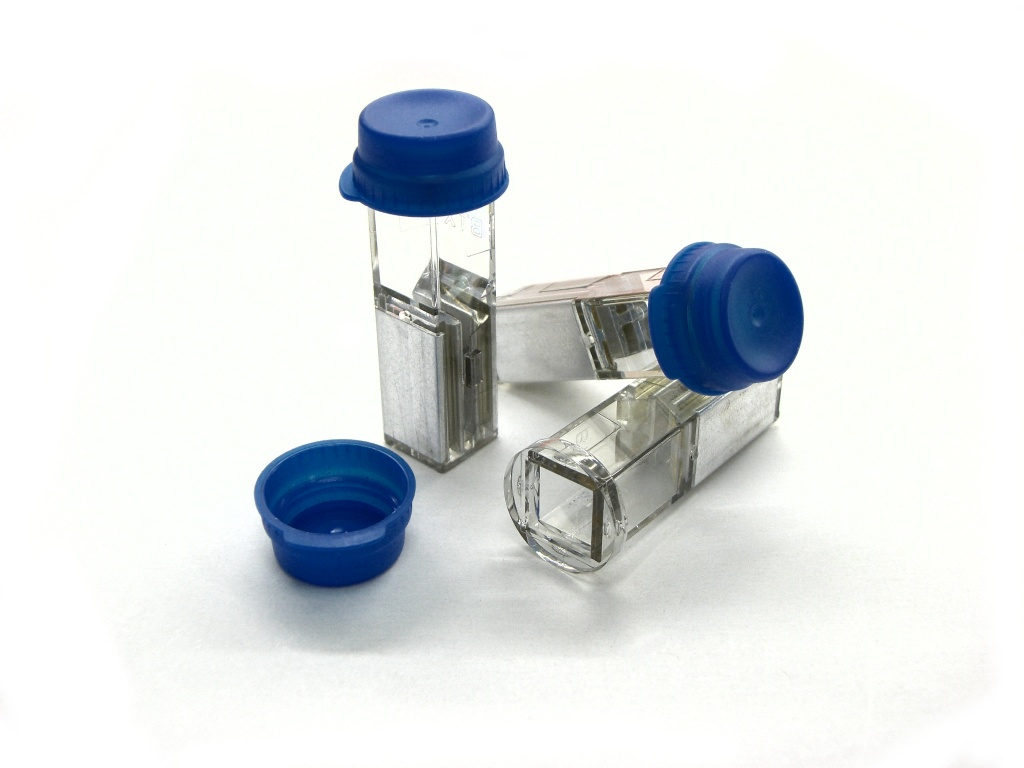
Cuvettes for in-vitro electroporation. These are plastic with aluminium electrodes and a blue lid. They hold a maximum of 400 μL.

Electroporation, also known as electropermeabilization, is a microbiological and biotechnological technique in which an electric field is applied to cells to briefly increase the permeability of the cell membrane. The application of a high-voltage electric field induces a temporary destabilization of the lipid bilayer, resulting in the formation of nanoscale pores that permit the entry or exit of macromolecules.

This method is widely employed to introduce molecules—including small molecules, DNA, RNA, and proteins—into cells. Electroporation can be performed on cells in suspension using electroporation cuvettes, or directly on adherent cells in situ within their culture vessels.

In microbiology, electroporation is frequently utilized for the transformation of bacteria or yeast cells, often with plasmid DNA. It is also used in the transfection of plant protoplasts and mammalian cells. Notably, electroporation plays a critical role in the ex vivo manipulation of immune cells for the development of cell-based therapies, such as CAR T-cell therapy. Moreover, in vivo applications of electroporation have been successfully demonstrated in various tissue types.

Bulk electroporation confers advantages over other physical delivery methods, including microinjection and gene gun techniques. However, it is limited by reduced cell viability. To address these issues, researchers have developed miniaturized approaches such as micro-electroporation and nanotransfection. These techniques utilize nanochannel-mediated electroporation to deliver molecular cargo to cells in a more controlled and less invasive manner.

Alternative methods for intracellular delivery include the use of cell-penetrating peptides, cell squeezing techniques, and chemical transformation, with selection depending on the specific cell type and cargo characteristics.

Electroporation is also employed to induce cell fusion. A prominent application of cell fusion is hybridoma technology, where antibody-producing B lymphocytes are fused with immortal myeloma cell lines to produce monoclonal antibodies.

== Laboratory research ==
Electroporation is widely utilized in laboratory settings due to its ability to achieve high transformation efficiencies, particularly for plasmid DNA, with reported yields approaching 10^{10} colony-forming units per microgram of DNA. Electroporation is generally more costly than chemical transformation methods due to the specialized equipment required. This includes electroporators—devices designed to generate controlled electrostatic fields for cell suspension—and electroporation cuvettes, which are typically constructed from glass or plastic and contain parallel aluminum electrodes.

A standard bacterial transformation protocol involves several steps. First, electro-competent cells are prepared by washing to remove ions that could cause arcing. These cells are then mixed with plasmid DNA and transferred into an electroporation cuvette. A high-voltage electric pulse is applied, with specific parameters such as voltage and pulse duration tailored to the particular cell type being used. Following electroporation, recovery medium is added, and the cells are incubated at an appropriate temperature to allow for outgrowth. Finally, the cells are plated onto selective agar plates to assess transformation efficiency.

The success of electroporation depends on several factors, including the purity of the plasmid DNA solution, salt concentration, and electroporation parameters. High salt concentrations can lead to arcing (electrical discharge), significantly reducing the viability of electroporated cells. Therefore, the electroporation conditions must be optimized for each cell type to achieve an effective balance between cell viability and DNA uptake.

In addition to in vitro applications, electroporation is employed in vivo to enhance cell membrane permeability during injections and surgical procedures. The effectiveness of in vivo electroporation depends greatly on selected parameters such as voltage, pulse duration, and number of pulses. Developing central nervous systems are particularly suitable for in vivo electroporation, as ventricles provide clear visibility for nucleic acid injections, and dividing cells exhibit increased permeability. Electroporation of embryos injected in utero is performed through the uterine wall, often using forceps-type electrodes to minimize embryo damage.

Low-cost and portable electroporation devices have also been described, including a piezoelectric lighter-derived handheld electroporator ("ElectroPen") and a microneedle-array skin electroporation system ("ePatch") designed for portable DNA vaccination studies.

== History ==
Early studies of pulsed electric fields in biology examined membrane damage and microbial inactivation. In the 1970s, it was found that when a critical membrane potential is reached, the cellular membrane would break down and subsequently recover. By the 1980s, this temporary membrane breakdown was exploited to introduce various molecules into cells.

Sale and Hamilton (1967–1968) reported that high-intensity electric field pulses could kill bacteria and yeasts and proposed membrane disruption as a key mechanism.

In the mid-1970s, Zimmermann and colleagues described reversible electric-field–induced membrane permeabilization ("dielectric breakdown" / electropermeabilization) using erythrocytes and bacteria, including experiments using an aperture-based Coulter-counter setup and follow-up measurements with electrodes and capacitor-discharge pulses.

Work in erythrocytes helped establish that pores could form and reseal under controlled conditions. In parallel, Auer, Brandner, and Bodemer reported uptake of SV40 DNA and mammalian RNA in red blood cells during dielectric breakdown.

The term electroporation (coined by Eberhard Neumann) entered common use with work demonstrating electric-field–mediated gene transfer in mammalian cells.

In vivo gene electroporation was first described in 1991. This method delivers a large variety of therapeutic genes for the potential treatment of several diseases, including immune disorders, tumors, metabolic disorders, monogenetic diseases, cardiovascular diseases, and analgesia.

Regarding irreversible electroporation, the first successful treatment of malignant cutaneous tumors implanted in mice was accomplished in 2007 by a group of scientists who achieved complete tumor ablation in 12 of 13 mice. They accomplished this by sending 80 pulses of 100 microseconds at 0.3 Hz with an electrical field magnitude of 2500 V/cm to treat the cutaneous tumors.

The first group to apply electroporation used a reversible procedure in conjunction with impermeable macromolecules. The first research on how nanosecond pulses might be used on human cells was published in 2003.

== Medical applications ==
The first medical application of electroporation was used for introducing poorly permeant anti-cancer drugs into tumor nodules. Gene electro-transfer soon became of interest because of its low cost, ease of implementation, and alleged safety. Viral vectors have since been found to have limitations in terms of immunogenicity and pathogenicity when used for DNA transfer.

Irreversible electroporation is being used and evaluated as cardiac ablation therapy to kill specific areas of heart muscle. This is done to treat irregularities of heart rhythm. A cardiac catheter delivers trains of high-voltage, ultra-rapid electrical pulses that form irreversible pores in cell membranes, resulting in cell death.

=== N-TIRE ===
Non-thermal irreversible electroporation (N-TIRE) is a technique that treats many different types of tumors and other unwanted tissue. This procedure is done using small electrodes (about 1mm in diameter), placed either inside or surrounding the target tissue to apply short, repetitive bursts of electricity at a predetermined voltage and frequency. These bursts of electricity increase the resting transmembrane potential (TMP) so that nanopores form in the plasma membrane. When the electricity applied to the tissue is above the electric field threshold of the target tissue, the cells become permanently permeable from the formation of nanopores. As a result, the cells are unable to repair the damage and die due to a loss of homeostasis. N-TIRE is unique to other tumor ablation techniques in that it does not create thermal damage to the tissue around it.

=== Reversible electroporation ===
In contrast, reversible electroporation occurs when the electricity applied with the electrodes is below the target tissue's electric field threshold. Because the electricity applied is below the cells' threshold, it allows the cells to repair their phospholipid bilayer and continue with their normal cell functions. Reversible electroporation is typically done with treatments that involve inserting a drug or gene (or other molecule that is not normally permeable to the cell membrane) into the cell. Not all tissues have the same electric field threshold; therefore, to improve safety and efficacy, careful calculations need to be made prior to a treatment.

N-TIRE, when done correctly, only affects the target tissue. Proteins, the extracellular matrix, and critical structures such as blood vessels and nerves are all unaffected and left healthy by this treatment. This facilitates a more rapid replacement of dead tumor cells and a faster recovery.

Imaging technology such as CT scans and MRIs are commonly used to create a 3D image of the tumor. Computed tomography is used to help with the placement of electrodes during the procedure, particularly when the electrodes are being used to treat tumors in the brain.

The procedure takes five minutes with a high success rate. It may be used for future treatment in humans. One disadvantage of using N-TIRE is that the electricity delivered from the electrodes can stimulate muscle cells to contract, which could have lethal consequences, depending on the situation. Therefore, a paralytic agent must be used when performing the procedure. The paralytic agents that have been used in such research have risks when using anesthetics.

=== H-FIRE ===
High-frequency irreversible electroporation (H-FIRE) uses electrodes to apply bipolar bursts of electricity at a high frequency, as opposed to unipolar bursts of electricity at a low frequency. This type of procedure has the same tumor ablation success as N-TIRE. However, it has one distinct advantage: H-FIRE does not cause muscle contraction in the patient, and therefore, there is no need for a paralytic agent. Furthermore, H-FIRE has been demonstrated to produce more predictable ablations due to the smaller differences in the electrical properties within and between tissues at higher frequencies.

=== Drug and gene delivery ===
Electroporation can also be used to help deliver drugs or genes into the cell by applying short and intense electric pulses that transiently permeabilize cell membrane, thus allowing the transport of molecules otherwise not transported through a cellular membrane. This procedure is referred to as electrochemotherapy when the molecules to be transported are chemotherapeutic agents or gene electrotransfer when the molecule to be transported is DNA. Scientists from Karolinska Institute and the University of Oxford use electroporation of exosomes to deliver siRNAs, antisense oligonucleotides, chemotherapeutic agents, and proteins specifically to neurons after injecting them systemically (in blood). Because these exosomes can cross the blood-brain barrier, this protocol could solve the problem of poor delivery of medications to the central nervous system and may potentially treat Alzheimer's disease, Parkinson's disease, and brain cancer, among other conditions.

Research has shown that shock waves could be used for pre-treating the cell membrane prior to electroporation. This synergistic strategy has shown to reduce external voltage requirement and create larger pores. Also, application of shock waves allow scope to target desired membrane site. This procedure allows to control the size of the pore.

== Physical mechanism ==
Schematic cross-section showing the theoretical arrangement of lipids in a hydrophobic pore (top) and a hydrophilic pore (bottom).

Electroporation allows cellular introduction of large highly charged molecules, such as DNA, that cannot passively diffuse across the hydrophobic bilayer core. This phenomenon indicates that the mechanism is the creation of nm-scale water-filled holes in the membrane. Electropores were optically imaged in lipid bilayer models like droplet interface bilayers and giant unilamellar vesicles, while addition of cytoskeleton proteins such as actin networks to the giant unilamellar vesicles seem to prevent the formation of visible electropores. Experimental evidences for actin networks in regulating the cell membrane permeability has also emerged. Although electroporation and dielectric breakdown both result from application of an electric field, the mechanisms involved are fundamentally different. In dielectric breakdown the barrier material is ionized, creating a conductive pathway. The material alteration is thus chemical in nature. In contrast, during electroporation the lipid molecules are not chemically altered but simply shift position, opening up a pore which acts as the conductive pathway through the bilayer as it is filled with water.

Electroporation is a dynamic phenomenon that depends on the local transmembrane voltage at each point on the cell membrane. It is generally accepted that for a given pulse duration and shape, a specific transmembrane voltage threshold exists for the manifestation of the electroporation phenomenon (from 0.5 V to 1 V). This leads to the definition of an electric field magnitude threshold for electroporation (E_{th}). That is, only the cells within areas where E≧E_{th} are electroporated. If a second threshold (E_{ir}) is reached or surpassed, electroporation will compromise the viability of the cells, i.e., irreversible electroporation (IRE).

Electroporation is a process with several distinct phases. First, a short electrical pulse is applied. Typical parameters would be 300–400 mV for < 1 ms across the membrane (note- the voltages used in cell experiments are typically much larger because they are being applied across large distances to the bulk solution so the resulting field across the actual membrane is only a small fraction of the applied bias). Application of this potential causes migration of ions from the surrounding solution to the membrane which charges like a capacitor. Rapid localized rearrangements in lipid morphology occur once the critical level is achieved. The resulting structure is believed to be a "pre-pore" since it is not electrically conductive but leads rapidly to the creation of a conductive pore. Evidence for the existence of such pre-pores comes mostly from the "flickering" of pores, which suggests a transition between conductive and insulating states. It has been suggested that these pre-pores are small (~3 Å) hydrophobic defects. If this theory is correct, then the transition to a conductive state could be explained by a rearrangement at the pore edge, in which the lipid heads fold over to create a hydrophilic interface. Finally, these conductive pores can either heal, resealing the bilayer or expand, eventually rupturing it. The resultant fate depends on whether the critical defect size was exceeded which in turn depends on the applied field, local mechanical stress and bilayer edge energy.

=== Gene Electrotransfer ===
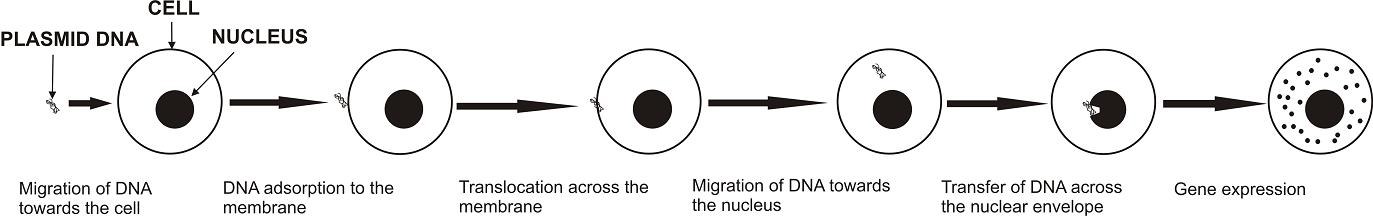

Application of electric pulses of sufficient strength to the cell causes an increase in the trans-membrane potential difference, which provokes the membrane destabilization. Cell membrane permeability is increased, and otherwise non-permeant molecules enter the cell. Although the mechanisms of gene electrotransfer are not yet fully understood, it was shown that the introduction of DNA only occurs in the part of the membrane facing the cathode and that several steps are needed for successful transfection: electrophoretic migration of DNA towards the cell, DNA insertion into the membrane, translocation across the spoke membrane, migration of DNA towards the nucleus, transfer of DNA across the nuclear envelope and finally gene expression. There are a number of factors that can influence the efficiency of gene electrotransfer, such as: temperature, parameters of electric pulses, DNA concentration, electroporation buffer used, cell size and the ability of cells to express transfected genes. In in vivo gene electrotransfer, DNA diffusion through extracellular matrix, properties of tissue, and overall tissue conductivity may be crucial.
