= Ingmar Hoerr =

German biologist and businessman

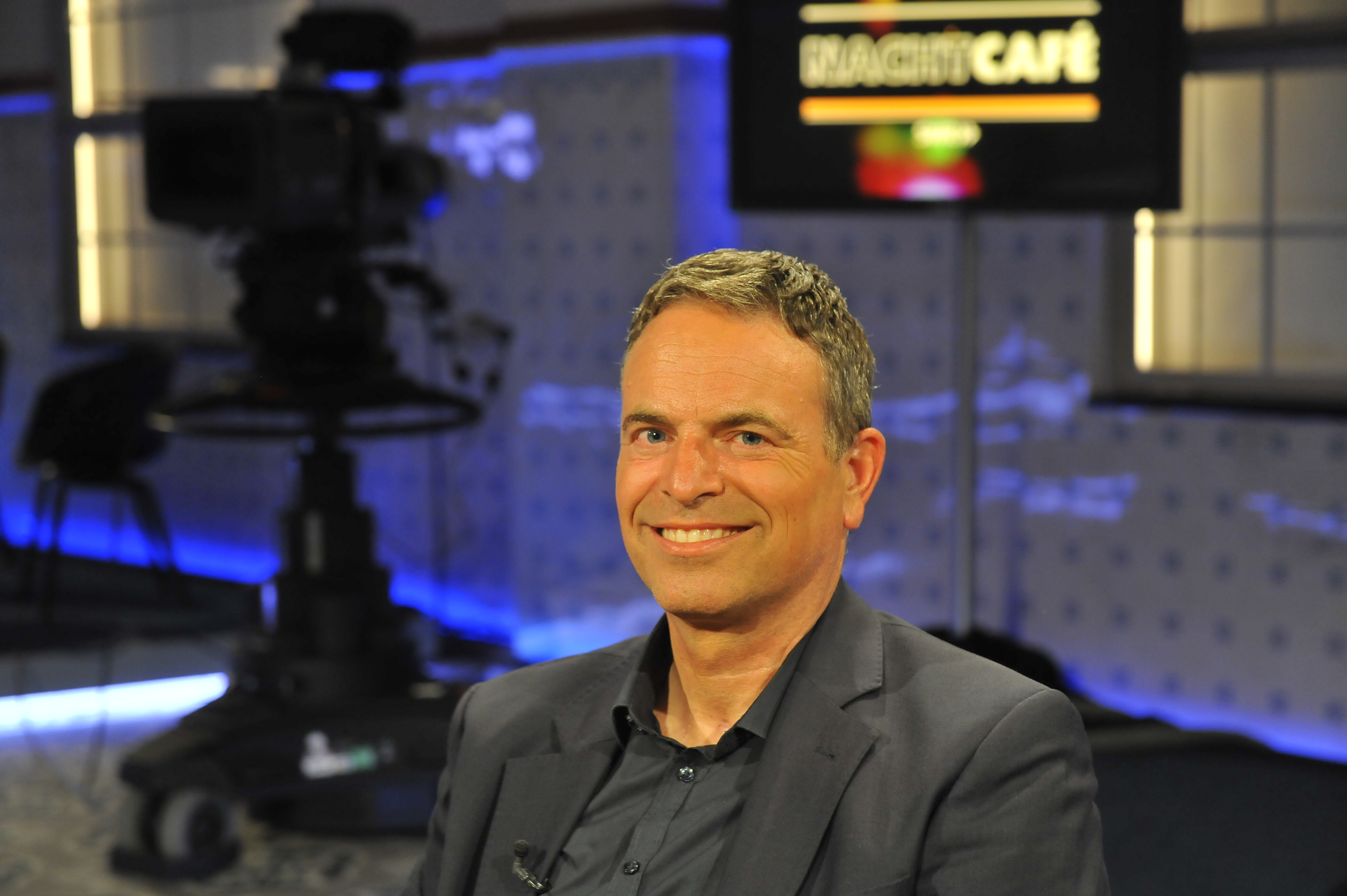
- Ingmar Hoerr at the TV-talkshow "Nachtcafe" of SWR
- Born: 1968 (age 57–58); Neckarsulm, Germany
- Education: University of Tübingen
- Occupations: Founder and CEO of CureVac

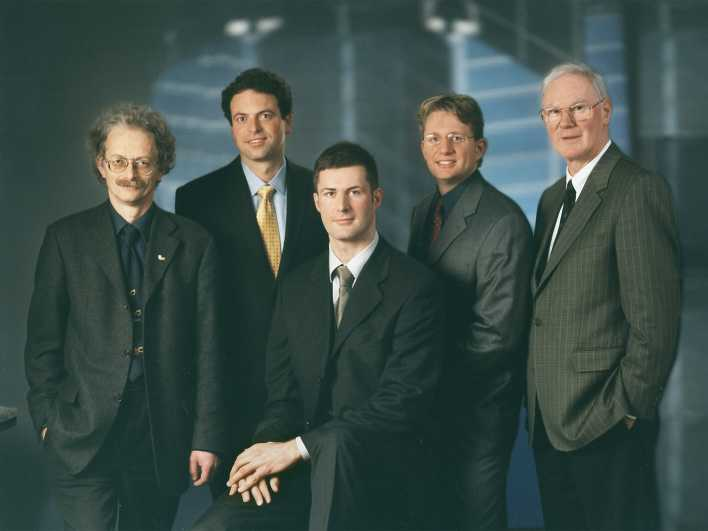
Founder of CureVac (from left):Prof. H.G. Rammensee; Ingmar Hoerr; Steve Pascolo; Florian von der Mülben; Prof. G. Jung.

Ingmar Malte Hoerr (born 1968 in Neckarsulm) is a German biologist. He pioneered vaccinology research concerning the use of RNA and is a founder of the German biotechnology company CureVac. He created the initial technology used in RNA vaccines and has reportedly been nominated for a Nobel Prize. He is currently an Ambassador for the European Innovation Council for the years 2021–2027.

== Early life and education ==
Hoerr graduated from the Johannes-Kepler-Realschule in Wendlingen am Neckar in 1985 and then attended an agricultural high school in Nürtingen, where he obtained his Abitur in 1988. From 1988 to 1990, he performed civilian service at the DRK Nürtingen as a paramedic. From 1990 to 1996 he studied biology at the University of Tübingen. During his studies, he spent a year at Madurai Kamaraj University, India.

== Career ==
=== Career in academia ===
Hoerr did experimental research on the stabilization of messenger ribonucleic acid (mRNA). In 1999, he received his PhD from Günther Jung, Institute of Organic Chemistry, in cooperation with Hans-Georg Rammensee, Institute of Immunology and Cell Biology (both: University of Tübingen) on the topic of RNA vaccines for the induction of specific cytotoxic T lymphocytes (CTL) and antibodies. In 2000, Hoerr published his doctoral thesis entitled "RNA vaccine for the induction of specific cytotoxic T-lymphocytes (CTL) and antibodies." In his thesis, Hoerr discovered that ribonucleic acid can be stabilized. This discovery made it easy to use ribonucleic acid for the development of vaccines and immunotherapies.

The dissertation investigated the development of RNA vaccines that will play a central role in the fight against COVID-19 starting in 2020. At the time, he vaccinated laboratory mice with an RNA construct and showed that such a vaccine does not immediately decay, as previously thought. Rather, stabilized RNA stimulates the immune system to produce antibodies and activate T cells that destroy pathogens. As early as 9 September 1999, Hoerr applied for a first patent for the new technology. In 2008 and 2009, the first clinical trials for the use of mRNA as a cancer vaccine were already underway.

Bill Gates, whose foundation invested in CureVac, rated Hoerr's pioneering work as groundbreaking in an interview with German newspaper Handelsblatt: "The first mRNA vaccines, developed by Pfizer-Biontech and Moderna in 2020, are the product of a multitude of ideas and discoveries by German scientist Ingmar Hoerr, who spent twenty years experimenting with messenger RNA."

As the success of the m-RNA vaccines grew, so did media interest in Hoerr. Der Spiegel ranked him among the pioneers of m-RNA vaccines, as did Die Zeit or Süddeutsche Zeitung and conducted interviews. There were appearances on popular German talk shows such as Lanz or Nachtcafe. International interest ranged from the French L'Express to the New York Times.

In May 2021, Ingmar Hoerr and Florian von der Mülbe, together with their partners, Sara Hörr and Kiriakoula Kapousouzi, founded the Morpho Foundation, a foundation for the promotion of culture and health projects.

=== Corporate career ===
In 2000, Hoerr, together with colleagues from the lab groups of Günther Jung and Hans-Georg Rammensee, founded the biopharmaceutical company CureVac.

In 2018, Hoerr gave up his office as chairman of the board and changed – as Chairman – to the supervisory board. Daniel L. Menichella was hired in that position in order to develop R&D and plants in the U.S., but the board changed its mind in 2020 and fired Menichella.

On 11 March 2020, Hoerr took over the position of CEO again at CureVac, replacing his interim successor Menichella. Later, Hoerr was replaced by Jean Stephenne as chairman of the supervisory board.

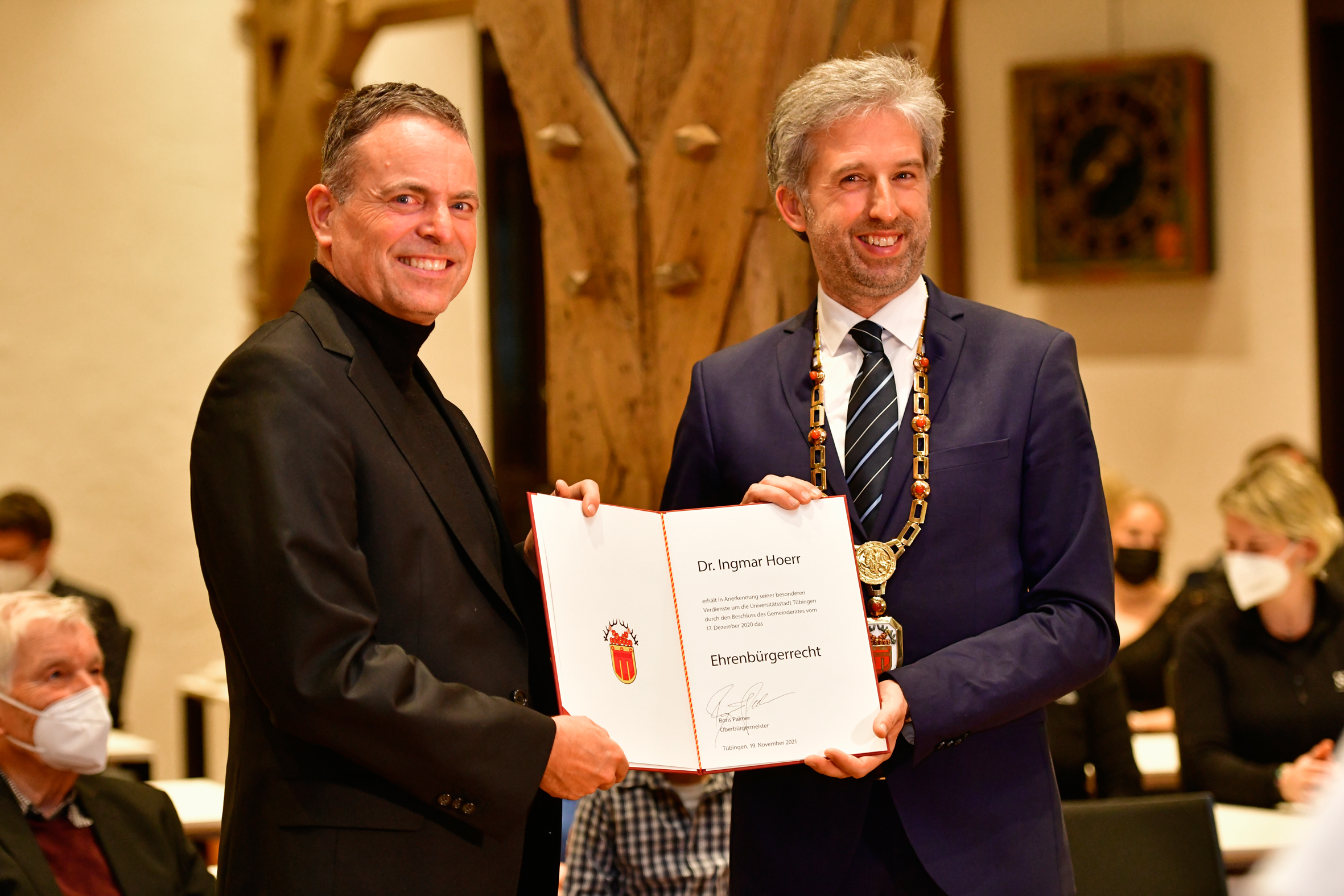
Receiving the Honorary Citizenship from the mayor of Tübingen, Boris Palmer.

In August 2020, Franz-Werner Haas replaced Hoerr as chief executive officer, after Hoerr suffered a severe health issue that March.

== Recognition ==
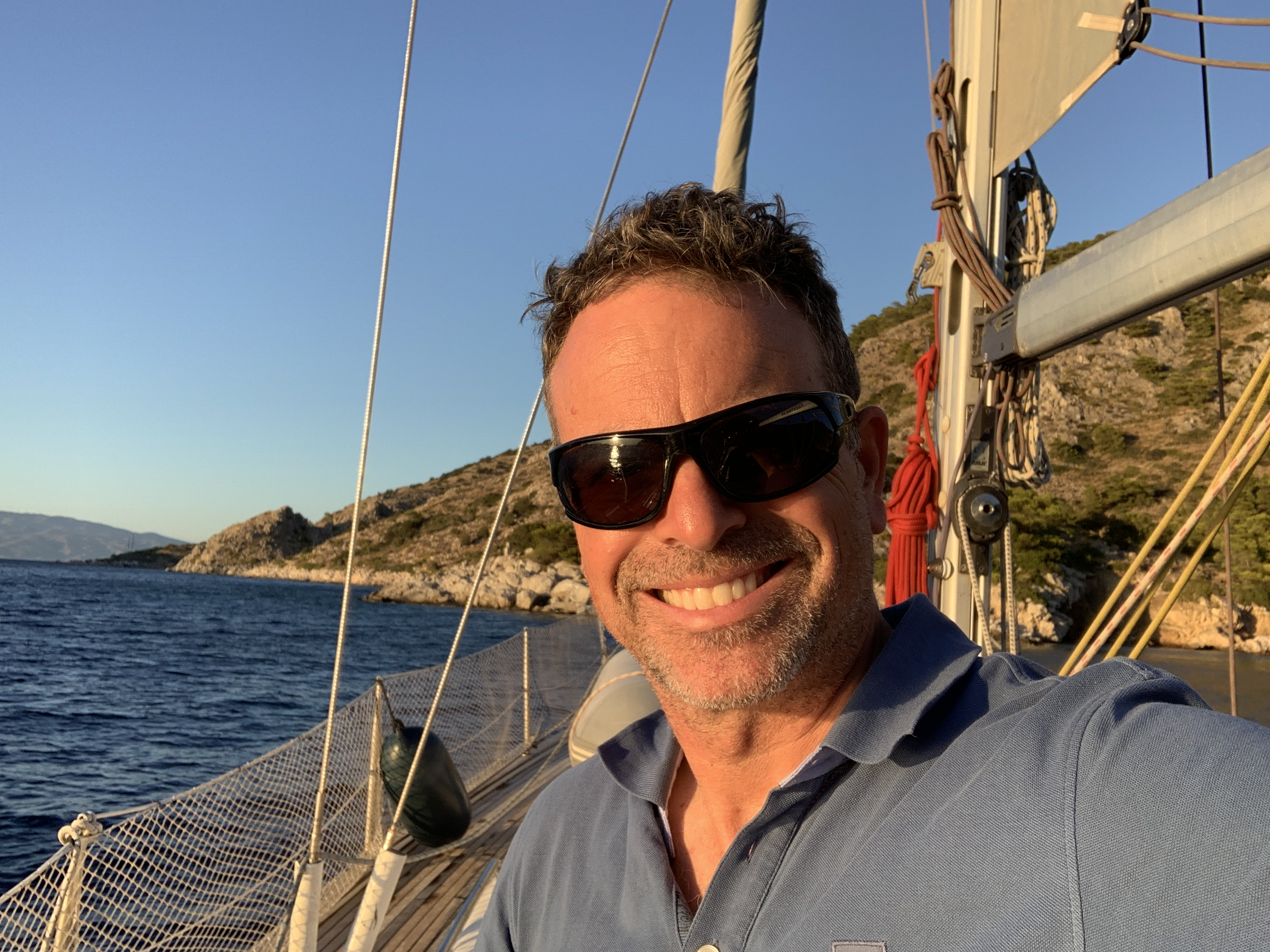
Ingmar Hoerr sailing

- 2018 – Honorary Senator Universität Tübingen
- 2020 – Honorary Citizen of the City of Tübingen
- 2021 – Medal of Honor Medical Faculty Universität Duisburg-Essen
- 2021 − Meyer-Schwickerath-Preis der Stiftung Universitätsmedizin Essen für seine Grundlagenforschung zur Boten-Ribonukleinsäure
- 2021 – Max-Bergmann-Medaille für die Entwicklung der messenger-RNA- (mRNA)-Impfstoffe als neuartigem Wirkstoffprinzip
- 2021 – German Innovation Award, Innovator of the Year

== Patents ==
- Günther Jung, Ingmar Hoerr, Hans-Georg Rammensee, Reinhard Obst: Transfer von mRNAs unter Verwendung von polykationischen Verbindungen. EP1083232. Erstveröffentlichung 9. September 1999, Patentinhaber: CureVac.
- Florian Von der Mülbe, Ingmar Hoerr, Steve Pascolo: Stabilisierte mRNA mit erhöhtem G/C-Gehalt und optimierter Codon Usage für die Gentherapie. WO2002098443. Erstveröffentlichung 12. Dezember 2002, Patentinhaber: CureVac.
- Ingmar Hoerr, Jochen Probst, Steve Pascolo: RNA-coded antibody. WO2008083949. Erstveröffentlichung 17. Juli 2008, Patentinhaber: CureVac.
- Ingmar Hoerr, Steve Pascolo: Optimierte Injektionsformulierung für mRNA. Veröffentlichungstag und Patenterteilung 19 June 2019, Europäische Patentschrift Nr EP 3 153 179 B1, Patentinhaber: CureVac.

== Publications ==
- Christiane Bormann; Daniel Baier; Ingmar Hörr; Claudia Raps; Jürgen Berger; Günther Jung; Heinz Schwarz. “Characterization of a Novel, Antifungal, Chitin-Binding Protein from Streptomyces tendae Tü901 That Interferes with Growth Polarity”. Journal of Bacteriology 181 (24), 7421–7429 (December 1999). doi:10.1128/JB.181.24.7421-7429.1999. PMID 10601197.
- Ingmar Hoerr; Reinhard Obst; Hans-Georg Rammensee; Günther Jung. “In vivo application of RNA leads to induction of specific cytotoxic T lymphocytes and antibodies”. European Journal of Immunology 30 (1), 1–7 (January 2000). PMID 10602021.
- Jean-Pierre Carralot; Jochen Probst; Ingmar Hoerr; Birgit Scheel; Ralf Teufel; Günther Jung; Hans-Georg Rammensee; Steve Pascolo. “Polarization of immunity induced by direct injection of naked sequence-stabilized mRNA vaccines”. Cellular and Molecular Life Sciences 61 (18), 2418–2424 (September 2004). doi:10.1007/s00018-004-4255-0. PMID 15378210.
- Birgit Scheel; Ralf Teufel; Jochen Probst; Jean-Pierre Carralot; Jens Geginat; Markus Radsak; David Jarrossay; Hermann Wagner; Günther Jung; Hans-Georg Rammensee; Ingmar Hoerr; Steve Pascolo. “Toll-like receptor-dependent activation of several human blood cell types by protamine-condensed mRNA”. European Journal of Immunology 35 (5), 1557–1566 (May 2005). doi:10.1002/eji.200425656. PMID 15832293.
- Ralf Teufel; Jean-Pierre Carralot; Birgit Scheel; Jochen Probst; Steffen Walter; Günther Jung; Ingmar Hoerr; Hans-Georg Rammensee; Steve Pascolo. “Human peripheral blood mononuclear cells transfected with messenger RNA stimulate antigen-specific cytotoxic T-lymphocytes in vitro”. Cellular and Molecular Life Sciences 62 (15), 1755–1762 (August 2005). doi:10.1007/s00018-005-5067-6. PMID 16003494.
- Jean-Pierre Carralot; Benjamin Weide; Oliver Schoor; Jochen Probst; Birgit Scheel; Ralf Teufel; Ingmar Hoerr; Claus Garbe; Hans-Georg Rammensee; Steve Pascolo. “Production and characterization of amplified tumor-derived cRNA libraries to be used as vaccines against metastatic melanomas”. Genetic Vaccines and Therapy 3, 6 (22 August 2005). doi:10.1186/1479-0556-3-6. PMID 16115316.
- Jochen Probst; Sonja Brechtel; Birgit Scheel; Ingmar Hoerr; Günther Jung; Hans-Georg Rammensee; Steve Pascolo. “Characterization of the ribonuclease activity on the skin surface”. Genetic Vaccines and Therapy 4, 4 (29 May 2006). doi:10.1186/1479-0556-4-4. PMID 16732888.
- Birgit Scheel; Stefan Aulwurm; Jochen Probst; Lothar Stitz; Ingmar Hoerr; Hans-Georg Rammensee; Michael Weller; Steve Pascolo. “Therapeutic anti-tumor immunity triggered by injections of immunostimulating single-stranded RNA”. European Journal of Immunology 36 (10), 2807–2816 (October 2006). doi:10.1002/eji.200635910. PMID 17013976.
- Jochen Probst; Benjamin Weide; Birgit Scheel; Bernd J. Pichler; Ingmar Hoerr; Hans-Georg Rammensee; Steve Pascolo. “Spontaneous cellular uptake of exogenous messenger RNA in vivo is nucleic acid-specific, saturable and ion dependent”. Gene Therapy 14 (15), 1175–1180 (August 2007). doi:10.1038/sj.gt.3302964. PMID 17476302.
- Benjamin Weide; Jean-Pierre Carralot; Alexander Reese; Birgit Scheel; Thomas K. Eigentler; Ingmar Hoerr; Hans-Georg Rammensee; Claus Garbe; Steve Pascolo. “Results of the first phase I/II clinical vaccination trial with direct injection of mRNA”. Journal of Immunotherapy 31 (2), 180–188 (February 2008). doi:10.1097/CJI.0b013e31815ce501. PMID 18481387.
- Benjamin Weide; Steve Pascolo; Birgit Scheel; Evelyna Derhovanessian; Anja Pflugfelder; Thomas K. Eigentler; Graham Pawelec; Ingmar Hoerr; Hans-Georg Rammensee; Claus Garbe. “Direct injection of protamine-protected mRNA: results of a phase 1/2 vaccination trial in metastatic melanoma patients”. Journal of Immunotherapy 32 (5), 498–507 (June 2009). doi:10.1097/CJI.0b013e3181a00068. PMID 19609242.
- Stefan M. Rittig; Monika Haentschel; Katrin J. Weimer; Anette Heine; Markus R. Muller; Wolfgang Brugger; Marius S. Horger; Oliver Maksimovic; Arnulf Stenzl; Ingmar Hoerr; Hans-Georg Rammensee; Tilman A. Holderried; Lothar Kanz; Steve Pascolo; Peter Brossart. “Intradermal vaccinations with RNA coding for TAA generate CD8+ and CD4+ immune responses and induce clinical benefit in vaccinated patients”. Molecular Therapy 19 (5), 990–999 (May 2011). doi:10.1038/mt.2010.289. PMID 21189474.
- Hubert Kübler; Birgit Scheel; Ulrike Gnad-Vogt; Kurt Miller; Wolfgang Schultze-Seemann; Frank vom Dorp; Giorgio Parmiani; Christian Hampel; Stefan Wedel; Lothar Trojan; Dieter Jocham; Thomas Maurer; Gerhard Rippin; Mariola Fotin-Mleczek; Florian von der Mülbe; Jochen Probst; Ingmar Hoerr; Karl-Josef Kallen; Thomas Lander; Arnulf Stenzl. “Self-adjuvanted mRNA vaccination in advanced prostate cancer patients: a first-in-man phase I/IIa study”. Journal for ImmunoTherapy of Cancer 3, 26 (16 June 2015). doi:10.1186/s40425-015-0068-y. PMID 26082837.
- Stefan M. Rittig; Monika Haentschel; Katrin J. Weimer; Anette Heine; Markus R. Müller; Wolfgang Brugger; Marius S. Horger; Oliver Maksimovic; Arnulf Stenzl; Ingmar Hoerr; Hans-Georg Rammensee; Tilman A. Holderried; Lothar Kanz; Steve Pascolo; Peter Brossart. “Long-term survival correlates with immunological responses in renal cell carcinoma patients treated with mRNA-based immunotherapy”. OncoImmunology 5 (5), e1108511 (29 October 2015). doi:10.1080/2162402X.2015.1108511. PMID 27467913.
- Hye-Sook Hong; Stephan D. Koch; Birgit Scheel; Ulrike Gnad-Vogt; Alexander Schröder; Karl-Josef Kallen; Volker Wiegand; Lars Backert; Oliver Kohlbacher; Ingmar Hoerr; Mariola Fotin-Mleczek; James M. Billingsley. “Distinct transcriptional changes in non-small cell lung cancer patients associated with multi-antigenic RNActive CV9201 immunotherapy”. OncoImmunology 5 (12), e1249560 (18 November 2016). doi:10.1080/2162402X.2016.1249560. PMID 28123889.
- Michael Alberer; Ulrike Gnad-Vogt; Hye-Sook Hong; Kai T. Mehr; Lars Backert; Greg Finak; Raphael Gottardo; Monica A. Bica; Antonella Garofano; Stephan D. Koch; Mariola Fotin-Mleczek; Ingmar Hoerr; Ralf Clemens; Frank von Sonnenburg. “Safety and immunogenicity of a mRNA rabies vaccine in healthy adults: an open-label, non-randomised, prospective, first-in-human phase 1 clinical trial”. The Lancet 390 (10101), 1511–1520 (23 September 2017). doi:10.1016/S0140-6736(17)31665-3. PMID 28754494.
- Martin Sebastian; Alexander Schröder; Birgit Scheel; Hye-Sook Hong; Alexander Muth; Lukas von Boehmer; Alfred Zippelius; Florian Mayer; Martin Reck; Djordje Atanackovic; Michael Thomas; Frank Schneller; Jan Stöhlmacher; Hubert Bernhard; Andreas Gröschel; Thomas Lander; Jochen Probst; Tobias Strack; Volker Wiegand; Ulrike Gnad-Vogt; Karl-Josef Kallen; Ingmar Hoerr; Florian von der Mülbe; Mariola Fotin-Mleczek; Alexander Knuth; Stephan D. Koch. “A phase I/IIa study of the mRNA-based cancer immunotherapy CV9201 in patients with stage IIIB/IV non-small cell lung cancer”. Cancer Immunology, Immunotherapy 68 (5), 799–812 (May 2019). doi:10.1007/s00262-019-02315-x. PMID 30770959.
- Andreas Thess; Ingmar Hoerr; Bahram Y. Panah; Günther Jung; Ralf Dahm. “Historic nucleic acids isolated by Friedrich Miescher contain RNA besides DNA”. Biological Chemistry 402 (10), 1179–1185 (27 September 2021). doi:10.1515/hsz-2021-0226. PMID 34523295.

== Documentary film ==
- Die Heilung – Eine Geschichte vom Weitermachen (English: The Healing), documentary film by Marcus Richardt and Lillian Rosa, Germany, 2026 (German theatrical release: 10 December 2026).

== Videos ==
- “Die RNA-Revolution” – Dr. Ingmar Hoerr, lecture in Studium Generale, University of Konstanz, 2024.
- Ingmar Hoerr über die Entdeckung einer neuen Impfmethode, Markus Lanz / ZDF, 26 November 2020.
- Durchfechter – Folge 40: Ingmar Hoerr, Stifterverband, 2023.
- #3: Ingmar Hoerr, SPRIND, 2026.
- Meyer-Schwickerath lecture and medal, Faculty of Medicine, University of Duisburg-Essen, 2021.
- Live interview with Dr. Ingmar Hoerr – from researcher to company founder, Wissensfabrik, 2021.
- CureVac founder Ingmar Hoerr: vaccinating the world, CHEFSACHE podcast, 2021.
- Dr. Ingmar Hoerr – discovered mRNA vaccination; when the world needed it, he was in a coma, UNFILTERED by Unhyde, 2026.
- Trailer for Die Heilung, mindjazz pictures, 2026.
- Im Herzen Gründer, Studio ZX for ZEIT für X.

== Literature ==
- Karberg, Sascha (2021). Der Mann, der das Impfen neu erfand Ingmar Hoerr, CureVac und der Kampf gegen die Pandemie (in German). Berlin: Aufbau. ISBN 978-3-351-03926-4. OCLC 1256538154.
- Klein, Wolfgang (2021). Die CureVac-Story Vom Risiko, die Medizin zu revolutionieren (in German). Frankfurt: Campus. ISBN 978-3-593-51490-1. OCLC 1241085997.
