= Jean Stéphenne =

Belgian businessman

Jean, Baron Stéphenne is a Belgian businessman. He studied chemistry and bioindustries and obtained an MSc degree at the Faculté universitaire des sciences agronomiques de Gembloux in 1972 and an MBA degree from the Université catholique de Louvain in 1982.

Jean Stéphenne joined SmithKline-RIT (now GlaxoSmithKline Biologicals) in 1974 as head of bacterial and viral vaccines production, he became vaccine production director in 1980. From 1981 to 1991, he served as vaccine plant director and R&D director. From 1988 to 1991, he was vice president of human vaccines research and development and production. From 1991 to 1998 he led the vaccines division, first as vice president and general manager, then senior vice president and general manager, until his appointment as president and general manager in 1998. Since 1998, Jean Stéphenne is president and general manager of GlaxoSmithKline Biologicals.

In 2001, Stéphenne was raised into the Belgian nobility by King Albert II and given the noble title Baron for life.

Since 2013, Jean Stéphenne is shareholder and chairman of OncoDNA.

Since September 2015 he was a member of the supervisory board of CureVac, a German biopharmaceutical company specialising in mRNA-based drugs. In April 2020, he was appointed as the chairman of the company.

== CureVac ==
Stéphenne was a member of the supervisory board of the German mRNA company CureVac from September 2015. On 2 April 2020, as the company began working on a COVID-19 vaccine, CureVac announced that its former deputy chairman Stéphenne had been appointed chairman of the supervisory board with immediate effect. Dietmar Hopp, the company's main shareholder, said that his experience in healthcare and vaccines made him the right chairman. In an interview with La Libre a week later, he said CureVac had 500 employees, 150 of them in manufacturing, and that his experience would help it bring a vaccine to market and distribute it.

BioNTech's exchange offer for CureVac closed on 18 December 2025, with about 86.75% of shares tendered. The supervisory board had unanimously recommended the offer, and under the transaction Stéphenne and nine other supervisory directors were to step down from their board positions when the offer closed. CureVac's Nasdaq listing ended in January 2026 after BioNTech completed the squeeze-out of the remaining shares.

== GSK Biologicals and other roles ==
A biography prepared by CureVac for the European Parliament states that Stéphenne was CEO of GSK Biologicals from 1989 until 2012 and its president from 2002 until 2012, and that he joined SmithKline-RIT in 1974 as a biology engineer in research and development. It lists him as president of the Union Wallonne des Entreprises (UWE) from 1997 to 2000, as chairman of Besix, TiGenix, IBA, the Wallonia Foreign Trade and Investment Agency, Henogen and Aseptic Technologies, as a former director of Fortis bank and GBL, and as chairman of Bone Therapeutics since 2018.
