= Günther Jung =

German chemist

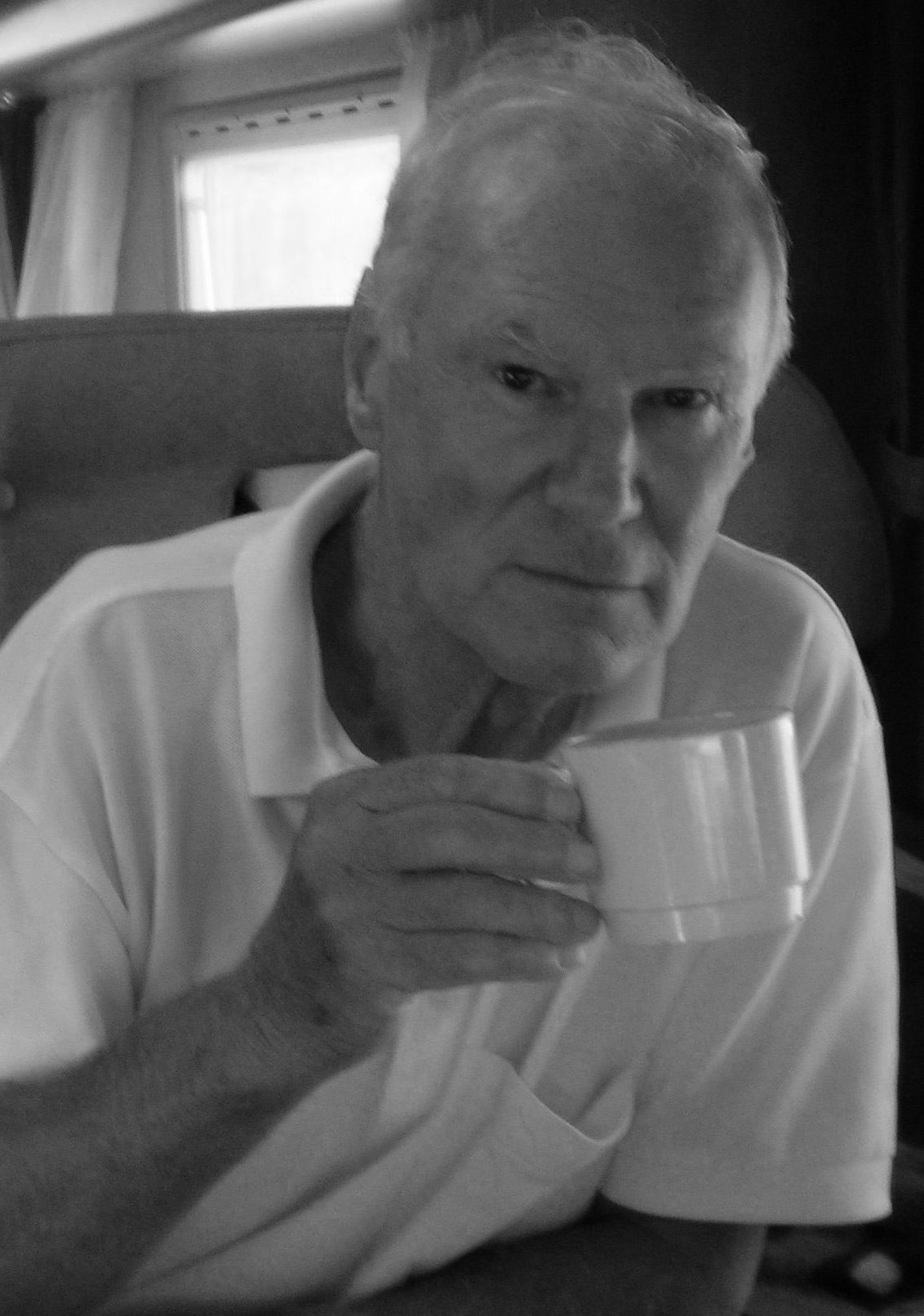
- Günther Jung (2019)
- Born: 2 September 1937; Tübingen, Germany
- Died: 30 June 2026 (aged 88)
- Occupation: chemist

Günther Jung (2 September 1937 – 30 June 2026) was a German chemist. He was a professor of organic chemistry and biochemistry at the University of Tübingen from 1973 to 2002.

== Career ==
Günther Jung studied chemistry at the University of Tübingen and after his diploma thesis in 1965 he received his PhD in 1967. From 1967 to 1968 he was assistant professor at the University of Houston in Texas (USA). In 1971 he was granted permission to teach organic chemistry and biochemistry at the University of Tübingen, where he held a permanent university professorship from 1973 to 2002. His successor in the department of organic chemistry is Stephanie Grond.

G. Jung has been in the advisory committee of eight scientific journals and on the boards of several institutions. He was also research consultant in the pharmaceutical industry and organized many international symposia and workshops. Until 1996 he was also director of the biochemistry department at the Research Institute of Natural and Medicinal Sciences and of the Steinbeis-Transfer-Center Bioorganic Chemistry at the University of Tübingen.

G. Jung was a cofounder of the European Peptide Society (EPS) and the European Society of Combinatorial Sciences (ESCS). Together with post-docs of his group he founded two biotech companies in Tübingen. EMC microcollections GmbH with Karl-Heinz Wiesmüller as the director with focus on the development of research tools, and peptides for the lead structure search and lipopeptide vaccines. Lipopeptide vaccines have been presented for the first time in 1985 followed by various in vivo applications which include a protective peptide vaccines against foot-and-mouth disease and the first demonstration of a virus-specific killer cell (CTL) response by a lipopeptide (1989).The lipopeptide adjuvans Pam3Cys-XSI5 developed by Wiesmüller induced in clinical tests of multipeptide vaccines against glioblastoma and CORONA virus strong and long lasting T-cell responses.

Jung's former PhD students Ingmar Hoerr and Florian von der Mülbe founded the biopharmaceutical company CureVac AG. In his pioneering PhD thesis Ingmar Hoerr was the first to develop an RNA vaccine for the induction of specific cytotoxic T-lymphocytes (CTL) and antibodies. This work is the scientific background of CureVac's messenger RNA as vaccines in oncology and against viral infections.

== Research ==
More than 120 scientists performed their experimental PhD thesis in the laboratories of G. Jung.

His research was focused on the following areas: structure elucidation and synthesis of natural products, synthetic potential-dependent ion channels in lipid membranes, 3D-structure and biosynthesis of microbial metabolites, automated multiple parallel synthesis of peptides and organic compounds, structure-activity relationships of peptide hormones, biosensor developments, combinatorial chemistry for lead structure search, peptide libraries, complete B- and T-cell epitope mapping of viral proteins, immunobiochemistry.

The sequence motifs of MHC-bound natural peptide libraries (major histocompatibility complex) has been determined for the first time by Günther Jung's PhD student Stefan Stevanovic in cooperation with the cell-biological group of Hans-Georg Rammensee. The elaborated analytical protocols are essential for the elucidation of the molecular interactions in cellular immunity and for the development of peptide-based personalized immunotherapies.

Numerous novel antibiotics with high structural variety and origin have been elucidated by Jung's group. The biosynthetic intermediates of ribosomally synthesized and post-translationally modified peptides of several lantibiotics have been analyzed and the corresponding enzymes have been characterized. For the first time these findings established the complete sequential steps for the biosynthesis of several lantibiotics in cooperation with microbiologists. The biosynthesis of vancomycin-type and other peptide antibiotics is now a major topic of the research group of Roderich Süßmuth.

== Awards ==
In 1989, he was awarded the Max-Bergmann Medallion for his scientific work in the field of Lantibiotics, and in 1992 he received the Leonidas Zervas Award of the European Peptide Society for distinguished contributions in the field of peptide chemistry. He received the Akabori Memorial Award 2000 form the Japanese Peptide Society and the ESCS-Award 2003 of the European Society of Combinatorial Sciences.

== Scientific Work and Publications (selection) ==
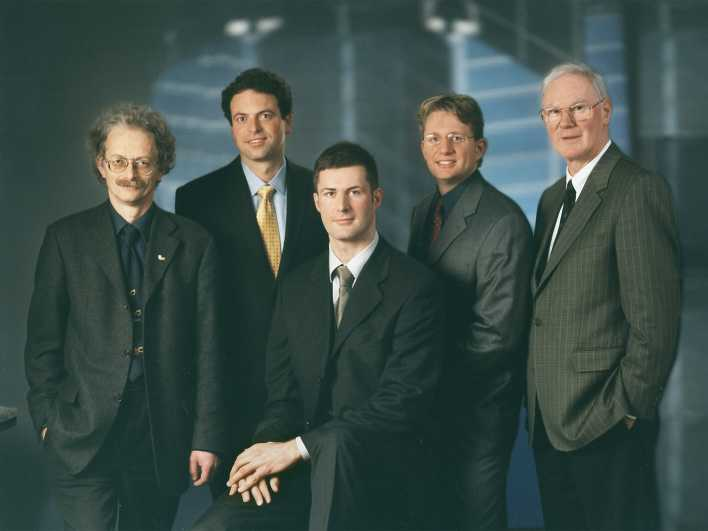
Founder of CureVac (from left): Prof. H.G. Rammensee; Ingmar Hoerr; Steve Pascolo; Florian von der Mülben; Prof. G. Jung.

Jung is author and co-author of more than 900 scientific publications, which include about 700 original experimental articles and several books.

=== Books ===
- Breitmaier, Eberhard; Jung, Günther; Wiley-VCH (2022). Organische Chemie: Grundlagen, Verbindungsklassen, Reaktionen, Konzepte, Molekülstruktur, Naturstoffe, Syntheseplanung, Nachhaltigkeit (in German). Weinheim. ISBN 978-3-527-35022-3. OCLC 1246166718.
- Jung, Günther (1999). Combinatorial chemistry: synthesis, analysis, screening. Weinheim: Wiley-VCH. ISBN 978-3-527-61350-2. OCLC 184983868.
- Jung, Günther (1996). Combinatorial peptide and nonpeptide libraries: a handbook. Weinheim: VCH. ISBN 978-3-527-61491-2. OCLC 212132318.
- Jung, Günther; Sahl, Hans-Georg (1991). Nisin and novel lantibiotics: proceedings of the First International Workshop on Lantibiotics, April 15-18, 1991, Physikzentrum Bad Honnef, F.R.G. Leiden: ESCOM. ISBN 978-90-72199-11-9. OCLC 28510522.

=== Publications in Journals ===
- Gunther, S.; Schlundt, A.; Sticht, J.; Roske, Y.; Heinemann, U.; Wiesmuller, K.-H.; Jung, G.; Falk, K.; Rotzschke, O.; Freund, C. (29 November 2010). "Bidirectional binding of invariant chain peptides to an MHC class II molecule". Proceedings of the National Academy of Sciences. 107 (51): 22219–22224. Bibcode:2010PNAS..10722219G. doi:10.1073/pnas.1014708107. ISSN 0027-8424. PMC 3009805. PMID 21115828.
- Dickhaut, Katharina; Hoepner, Sabine; Eckhard, Jamina; Wiesmueller, Karl-Heinz; Schindler, Luise; Jung, Guenther; Falk, Kirsten; Roetzschke, Olaf (7 September 2009). Unutmaz, Derya (ed.). "Enhancement of Tumour-Specific Immune Responses In Vivo by 'MHC Loading-Enhancer' (MLE)". PLOS ONE. 4 (9) e6811. Public Library of Science (PLoS). Bibcode:2009PLoSO...4.6811D. doi:10.1371/journal.pone.0006811. ISSN 1932-6203. PMC 2735034. PMID 19738910.
- Thern, Bernd; Rudolph, Joachim; Jung, Günther (3 July 2002). "Total Synthesis of the Nematicidal Cyclododecapeptide Omphalotin A by Using Racemization-Free Triphosgene-Mediated Couplings in the Solid Phase". Angewandte Chemie International Edition. 41 (13). Wiley: 2307–2309. doi:10.1002/1521-3773(20020703)41:13<2307::aid-anie2307>3.0.co;2-y. ISSN 1433-7851. PMID 12203574.
- Rademann, Jörg; Jung, Günther (17 March 2000). "Integrating Combinatorial Synthesis and Bioassays". Science. 287 (5460). American Association for the Advancement of Science (AAAS): 1947–1948. doi:10.1126/science.287.5460.1947. ISSN 0036-8075. PMID 10755947. S2CID 60766082.
- I.Hoerr, R.Obst, H.-G. Rammensee, and G.Jung:In vivo application of RNA leads to the induction of specific cytotoxic T lymphocytes and antibodies. In: Eur.J.Immunol, 30, 2000, S. 1–7.
- Kupke, Thomas; Kempter, Christoph; Jung, Günther; Götz, Friedrich (1995). "Oxidative Decarboxylation of Peptides Catalyzed by Flavoprotein EpiD". Journal of Biological Chemistry. 270 (19). Elsevier BV: 11282–11289. doi:10.1074/jbc.270.19.11282. ISSN 0021-9258. PMID 7744764.
- Bayer, Anja; Freund, Stefan; Nicholson, Graeme; Jung, Günther (1993). "Posttranslational Backbone Modifications in the Ribosomal Biosynthesis of the Glycine-Rich Antibiotic Microcin B17". Angewandte Chemie International Edition in English. 32 (9). Wiley: 1336–1339. doi:10.1002/anie.199313361. ISSN 0570-0833.
- Rötzschke, Olaf; Falk, Kirsten; Stevanović, Stefan; Grahovac, Blazenka; Soloski, Mark J.; Jung, Günther; Rammensee, Hans-Georg (1993). "Qa-2 molecules are peptide receptors of higher stringency than ordinary class I molecules". Nature. 361 (6413). Springer Science and Business Media LLC: 642–644. Bibcode:1993Natur.361..642R. doi:10.1038/361642a0. ISSN 0028-0836. PMID 8437623. S2CID 4342897.
- Falk, Kirsten; Rötzschke, Olaf; Stevanovié, Stefan; Jung, Günther; Rammensee, Hans-Georg (1991). "Allele-specific motifs revealed by sequencing of self-peptides eluted from MHC molecules". Nature. 351 (6324). Springer Science and Business Media LLC: 290–296. Bibcode:1991Natur.351..290F. doi:10.1038/351290a0. ISSN 0028-0836. PMID 1709722. S2CID 4342714.
- Rötzschke, Olaf; Falk, Kirsten; Deres, Karl; Schild, Hansjörg; Norda, Maria; Metzger, Jörg; Jung, Günther; Rammensee, Hans-Georg (1990). "Isolation and analysis of naturally processed viral peptides as recognized by cytotoxic T cells". Nature. 348 (6298). Springer Science and Business Media LLC: 252–254. Bibcode:1990Natur.348..252R. doi:10.1038/348252a0. ISSN 0028-0836. PMID 1700304. S2CID 4234900.
- Wiesmüller, Karl-Heinz; Jung, Günther; Hess, Günter (1989). "Novel low-molecular-weight synthetic vaccine against foot-and-mouth disease containing a potent B-cell and macrophage activator". Vaccine. 7 (1). Elsevier BV: 29–33. doi:10.1016/0264-410x(89)90007-8. ISSN 0264-410X. PMID 2470215.
- Deres, Karl; Schild, Hansjörg; Wiesmüller, Karl-Heinz; Jung, Günther; Rammensee, Hans-Georg (1989). "In vivo priming of virus-specific cytotoxic T lymphocytes with synthetic lipopeptide vaccine". Nature. 342 (6249). Springer Science and Business Media LLC: 561–564. Bibcode:1989Natur.342..561D. doi:10.1038/342561a0. ISSN 0028-0836. PMID 2586628. S2CID 4316816.
- Schnell, Norbert; Entian, Karl-Dieter; Schneider, Ursula; Götz, Friedrich; Zähner, Hans; Kellner, Roland; Jung, Günther (1988). "Prepeptide sequence of epidermin, a ribosomally synthesized antibiotic with four sulphide-rings". Nature. 333 (6170). Springer Science and Business Media LLC: 276–278. Bibcode:1988Natur.333..276S. doi:10.1038/333276a0. ISSN 0028-0836. PMID 2835685. S2CID 1801641.
- Jung, Günther; Wiesmüller, Karl-Heinz; Becker, Gerhard; Bühring, Hans-Jörg; Bessler, Wolfgang G. (1985). "Increased Production of Specific Antibodies by Presentation of the Antigen Determinants with Covalently Coupled Lipopetide Mitogens". Angewandte Chemie International Edition in English. 24 (10). Wiley: 872–873. doi:10.1002/anie.198508721. ISSN 0570-0833.
- Heitmann, Jonas S.; Bilich, Tatjana; Tandler, Claudia; Nelde, Annika; Maringer, Yacine; Marconato, Maddalena; Reusch, Julia; Jäger, Simon; Denk, Monika; Richter, Marion; Anton, Leonard; Weber, Lisa Marie; Roerden, Malte; Bauer, Jens; Rieth, Jonas; Wacker, Marcel; Hörber, Sebastian; Peter, Andreas; Meisner, Christoph; Fischer, Imma; Löffler, Markus W.; Karbach, Julia; Jäger, Elke; Klein, Reinhild; Rammensee, Hans-Georg; Salih, Helmut R.; Walz, Juliane S. (27 January 2022). "A COVID-19 peptide vaccine for the induction of SARS-CoV-2 T cell immunity". Nature. 601 (7894): 617–622. Bibcode:2022Natur.601..617H. doi:10.1038/s41586-021-04232-5. ISSN 0028-0836. PMC 8791831. PMID 34814158.
- Thess, Andreas; Hoerr, Ingmar; Panah, Benyamin Yazdan; Jung, Günther; Dahm, Ralf (27 September 2021). "Historic nucleic acids isolated by Friedrich Miescher contain RNA besides DNA". Biological Chemistry. 402 (10): 1179–1185. doi:10.1515/hsz-2021-0226. ISSN 1431-6730. PMID 34523295.
