= Nucleoside-modified messenger RNA =

Chemically modified messenger RNA

A nucleoside-modified messenger RNA (modRNA) is a synthetic messenger RNA (mRNA) in which some nucleosides are replaced by other naturally modified nucleosides or by synthetic nucleoside analogues. modRNA is used to induce the production of a desired protein in certain cells. An important application is the development of mRNA vaccines, of which the first authorized were COVID-19 vaccines (such as Comirnaty and Spikevax).

== Background ==
A ribosome (depicted in green) creates a protein (depicted here as a string of beads representing amino acids) encoded in an mRNA (depicted as a ribbon of nucleotides) that may be modified to reduce inflammation in the cell.

mRNA is produced by synthesising a ribonucleic acid (RNA) strand from nucleotide building blocks according to a deoxyribonucleic acid (DNA) template, a process that is called transcription. When the building blocks provided to the RNA polymerase include non-standard nucleosides such as pseudouridine — instead of the standard adenosine, cytidine, guanosine, and uridine nucleosides — the resulting mRNA is described as nucleoside-modified.

Production of protein begins with assembly of ribosomes on the mRNA, the latter then serving as a blueprint for the synthesis of proteins by specifying their amino acid sequence based on the genetic code in the process of protein biosynthesis called translation.

== Overview ==
To induce cells to make proteins that they do not normally produce, it is possible to introduce heterologous mRNA into the cytoplasm of the cell, bypassing the need for transcription. In other words, a blueprint for foreign proteins is "smuggled" into the cells. To achieve this goal, however, one must bypass cellular systems that prevent the penetration and translation of foreign mRNA. There are nearly-ubiquitous enzymes called ribonucleases (also called RNAses) that break down unprotected mRNA. There are also intracellular barriers against foreign mRNA, such as innate immune system receptors, toll-like receptor (TLR) 7 and TLR8, located in endosomal membranes. RNA sensors like TLR7 and TLR8 can dramatically reduce protein synthesis in the cell, trigger release of cytokines such as interferon and TNF-alpha, and when sufficiently intense lead to programmed cell death.

The inflammatory nature of exogenous RNA can be masked by modifying the nucleosides in mRNA. For example, uridine can be replaced with a similar nucleoside such as pseudouridine (Ψ) or N1-methyl-pseudouridine (m1Ψ), and cytosine can be replaced by 5-methylcytosine. Some of these, such as pseudouridine and 5-methylcytosine, occur naturally in eukaryotes, while m1Ψ occurs naturally in archaea. Inclusion of these modified nucleosides alters the secondary structure of the mRNA, which can reduce recognition by the innate immune system while still allowing effective translation.

== Significance of untranslated regions ==
A normal mRNA starts and ends with sections that do not code for amino acids of the actual protein. These sequences at the 5′ and 3′ ends of an mRNA strand are called untranslated regions (UTRs). The two UTRs at their strand ends are essential for the stability of an mRNA and also of a modRNA as well as for the efficiency of translation, i.e. for the amount of protein produced. By selecting suitable UTRs during the synthesis of a modRNA, the production of the target protein in the target cells can be optimised.

== Delivery ==
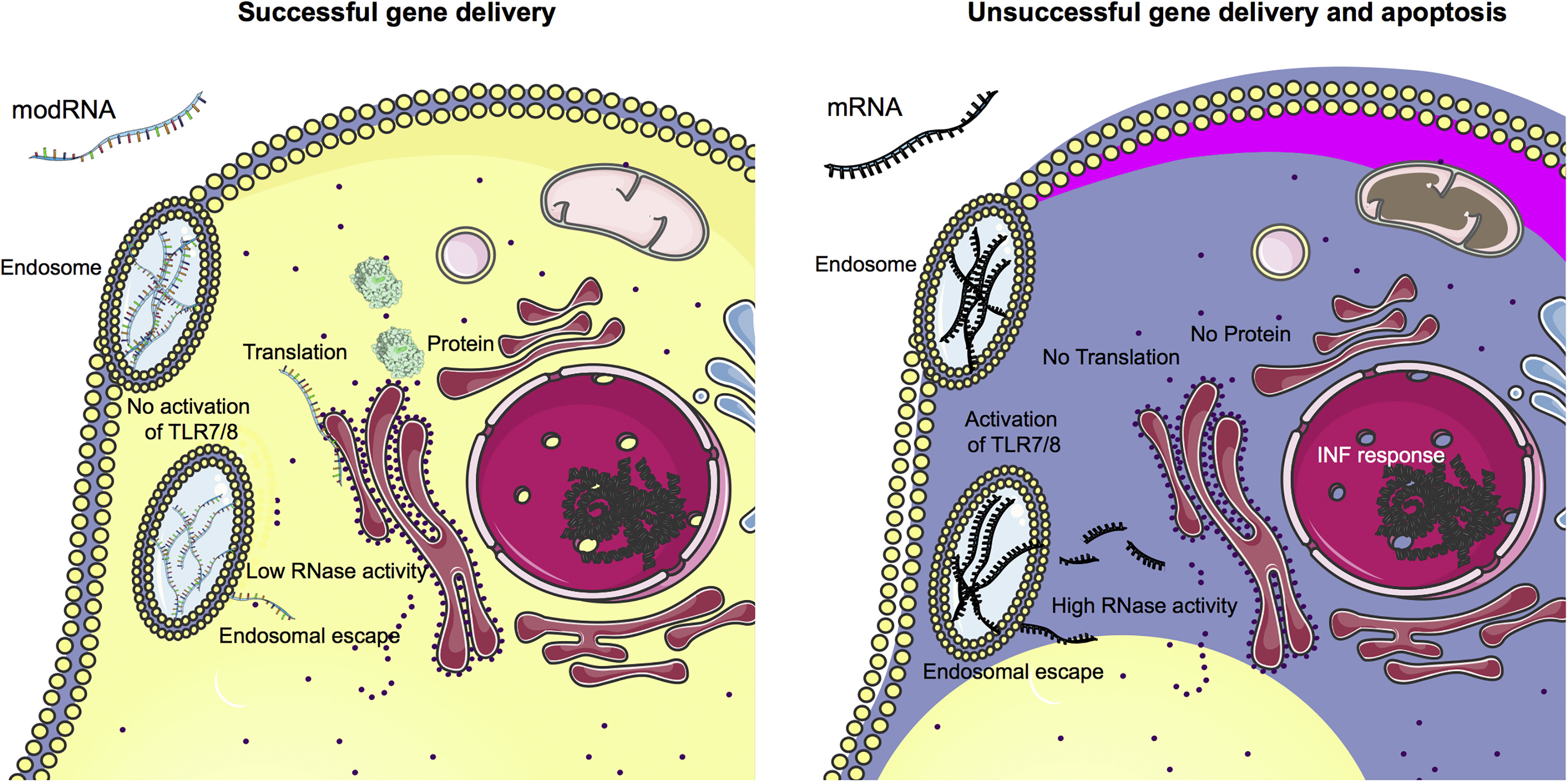
Comparing uptake of RNA and modRNA by the cell

Various difficulties are involved in the introduction of modRNA into certain target cells. First, the modRNA must be protected from ribonucleases. This can be accomplished, for example, by wrapping it in liposomes. Such "packaging" can also help to ensure that the modRNA is absorbed into the target cells. This is useful, for example, when used in vaccines, as nanoparticles are taken up by dendritic cells and macrophages, both of which play an important role in activating the immune system.

Furthermore, it may be desirable that the modRNA applied is introduced into specific body cells. This is the case, for example, if heart muscle cells are to be stimulated to multiply. In this case, the packaged modRNA can be injected directly into an artery such as a coronary artery.

== Applications ==
An important field of application are mRNA vaccines.

Replacing uridine with pseudouridine to evade the innate immune system was pioneered by Karikó and Weissman in 2005. They won the 2023 Nobel Prize in Physiology or Medicine as a result of their work.

Another milestone was achieved by demonstrating the life-saving efficacy of nucleoside modified mRNA in a mouse model of a lethal lung disease by the team of Kormann and others in 2011.

N1-methyl-pseudouridine was used in vaccine trials against Zika, HIV-1, influenza, and Ebola in 2017–2018.

The first authorized for use in humans were COVID-19 vaccines to address SARS-CoV-2. Examples of COVID-19 vaccines using modRNA include those developed by the cooperation of BioNTech/Pfizer (BNT162b2), and by Moderna (mRNA-1273). The zorecimeran vaccine developed by Curevac, however, uses unmodified mRNA, instead relying on codon optimization to minimize the presence of uridine. This vaccine is less effective, however.

Other possible uses of modRNA include the regeneration of damaged heart muscle tissue, an enzyme-replacement tool and cancer therapy.
