= CureVac =

German bio-pharmaceutical company

CureVac N.V.
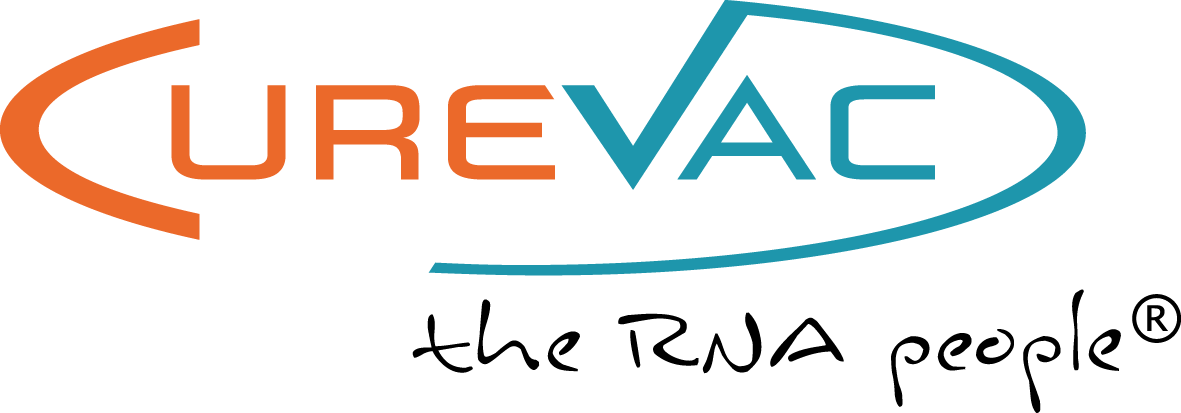
- Type: Public
- Traded as: Nasdaq: CVAC
- Industry: Biotechnology
- Founded: 2000; 26 years ago
- Founders: Ingmar Hoerr; Steve Pascolo; Florian von der Muelbe; Günther Jung; Hans-Georg Rammensee
- Headquarters: Tübingen, Germany
- Key people: Franz-Werner Haas (CEO); Steve Pascolo (CSO); Florian von der Mulbe (COO)
- Total equity: €1.40 billion (October 2017)
- Number of employees: < 700
- Website: www.curevac.com

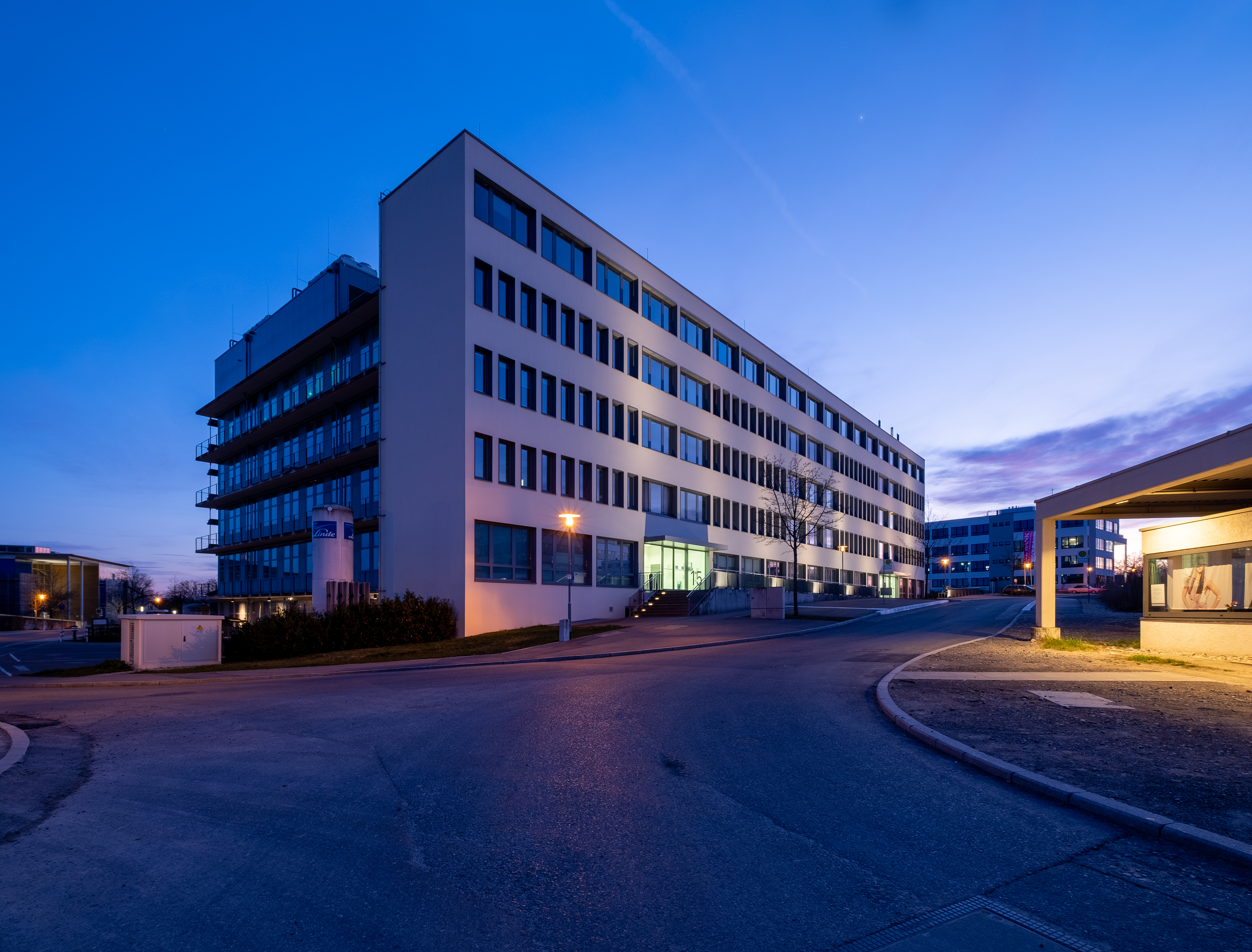
Headquarters of CureVac in Tübingen

CureVac is a biopharmaceutical company based in Tübingen, Germany that develops therapies based on messenger RNA (mRNA). With approximately 375 employees in 2018, it was founded in 2000 by Ingmar Hoerr, Steve Pascolo, Florian von der Mulbe, Günther Jung, and Hans-Georg Rammensee.

At the beginning of the COVID-19 pandemic, CureVac was an early starter in the race to develop a German vaccine for protection against COVID-19, a disease caused by infection with the SARS-CoV-2 virus. Clinical trials for the CureVac COVID-19 Vaccine (CVnCoV) began in June 2020, and in the same month, the German Federal Government invested €300 million in CureVac, with one of the terms of the agreement being that KfW will hold a stake of approximately 23% in the company.

In June 2021, it announced that CVnCoV displayed inadequate results in Phase III clinical trials with only 47% efficacy. In October, the company announced it would abandon further research and development into CVnCoV and would instead focus its efforts on collaborating with GSK to develop improved mRNA vaccine technology.

Focused on developing vaccines for infectious diseases and drugs to treat cancer and rare diseases, the firm has entered into various collaborations with organizations; among them are Eli Lilly and Company, Johnson & Johnson, GlaxoSmithKline, CEPI, IAVI, and the government of Germany.

== History ==
=== Research collaborations ===
In 2007, Curevac received the innovation prize of the state of Baden-Württemberg and was also the winner of the nationwide Weconomy competition, which is jointly awarded by the Handelsblatt newspaper and the Wissensfabrik.

In October 2013, CureVac launched a collaboration with Janssen Pharmaceuticals Inc., a Johnson & Johnson company, for the development of novel flu vaccines. Also in 2013, CureVac announced the fourth in a series of partnerships with the Cancer Research Institute and Ludwig Cancer Research to enable clinical testing of novel cancer immunotherapy treatment options.

In March 2014, CureVac won a €2 million prize awarded by the European Commission to stimulate new vaccine technologies. Later, in July 2014, CureVac signed an exclusive license agreement with Sanofi Pasteur to develop and commercialize an mRNA-based prophylactic vaccine. By September 2014, the company licensed the global rights for its Phase I candidate – CV9202 – to Boehringer Ingelheim. Boehringer was to conduct trials using the mRNA vaccine in combination with afatinib in advanced and/or metastatic epidermal growth factor receptor (EGFR) mutated non-small cell lung cancer (NSCLC) as well as inoperable stage III NSCLC.

In March 2015, a CureVac investor, the Bill & Melinda Gates Foundation, agreed to provide separate funding for several projects to develop prophylactic vaccines based on CureVac's proprietary mRNA platform. By September 2015, CureVac entered into a collaboration with the International AIDS Vaccine Initiative (IAVI) to accelerate the development of AIDS vaccines, utilizing immunogens developed by IAVI and partners, delivered via CureVac's mRNA technology. That same month, CureVac announced it would open a United States hub in Boston, Massachusetts.

In accordance with its deal with Eli Lilly and Company, the company began construction on a production facility in 2016.

In February 2019, the Coalition for Epidemic Preparedness Innovations (CEPI) awarded CureVac a $34 million grant to develop its proprietary "RNA printer" prototype. The technology is expected to allow the company to rapidly produce mRNA vaccine candidates at scale from multiple locations globally to bypass the logistical hurdles that often delay the production of vaccines in response to infectious disease emergencies. It is also expected to enable the production of personalized medicines. The initial uses would be for their candidate vaccines for Lassa fever, yellow fever, and rabies.

In July 2020, Tesla, Inc CEO Elon Musk announced via a Tweet that Tesla and CureVac had reached an agreement to produce portable "RNA microfactories" based on this technology to manufacture CureVac's COVID-19 vaccine candidate. CureVac had stated that the bioprinters would be able to produce “more than a hundred thousand doses” within approximately two weeks. At approximately the same time, Tesla and CureVac filed a joint patent on the technology. In August, Musk reviewed the project with Curevac while in Germany.

=== Investment ===
By 2017, CureVac had received investments of approximately €305 million in the form of equity and was valued at €1.40 billion. In June 2020, the federal government announced that the state-owned development bank KfW would immediately invest €300 million in CureVac, which will mean that it will hold a 23% stake in CureVac.

On 14 August 2020, CureVac began public trading on the NASDAQ exchange under the ticker symbol, CVAC, raising $213 million in its initial public offering.

=== Reports of Trump administration overtures ===
On 11 March 2020, it was reported that CureVac AG's CEO Daniel Menichella was no longer the company's CEO, having been replaced by the company founder Ingmar Hoerr. Menichella was reported to have met U.S. President Donald Trump on 2 March. According to Welt am Sonntag, quoting an anonymous German government source, Trump had attempted to persuade CureVac to relocate to the United States, a proposal vigorously rejected by German officials. On 16 March, CureVac issued a statement on Twitter, stating "To make it clear again on coronavirus: CureVac has not received from the US government or related entities an offer before, during and since the Task Force meeting in the White House on March 2. CureVac rejects all allegations from press."

=== Acquisition ===
In June 2025, BioNTech announced its intention to buy CureVac in an all-stock deal valued at US$1.25 billion. On December 18, it was announced that the transaction had been completed after 86.75% of Curevac's shares had been traded.

== COVID-19 vaccine candidate ==
CVnCoV is an mRNA vaccine that encodes a minimal piece of the coronavirus spike protein and activates the immune system against it. CVnCoV technology does not interact with the human genome.

In December 2020, CureVac began a Phase III clinical trial of CVnCoV with 36,500 participants. Bayer will provide clinical trial support and international logistics for the Phase III trial and may be involved in eventual manufacturing should the vaccine prove to be safe and effective. In January 2021, CureVac announced a clinical development collaboration for its COVID-19 vaccine, named CVnCoV (active ingredient zorecimeran), with the multinational pharmaceutical company Bayer. As of December 2020, CVnCoV was in a Phase III clinical trial of 36,500 participants. On 12 February 2021, CureVac announced the initiation of a rolling submission with the European Medicines Agency (EMA) for their vaccine candidate, a time-optimized process for the review of all data necessary for potential market authorization. On 16 June 2021, the CureVac announced that Phase III trials of its mRNA vaccine showed an efficacy of 47%. This falls short of the European Medicines Agency's target efficacy of at least 50%.

Beyond CVnCoV, CureVac has also partnered with GlaxoSmithKline (GSK) to develop a new generation of mRNA-based COVID-19 vaccines. Human testing is due in late 2021.

The start of the phase 1 study with the product candidate CV2CoV, which was announced for the fourth quarter of 2021, had to be postponed to the first quarter of 2022. Since an approval-relevant study for the new vaccine can only be carried out in the fourth quarter of 2022, the goal originally set for mid-October of “obtaining official approval for the marketability of an improved Covid-19 vaccine in 2022” can be achieved in 2023 at the earliest.
