= Moderna COVID-19 vaccine =

RNA COVID-19 vaccine

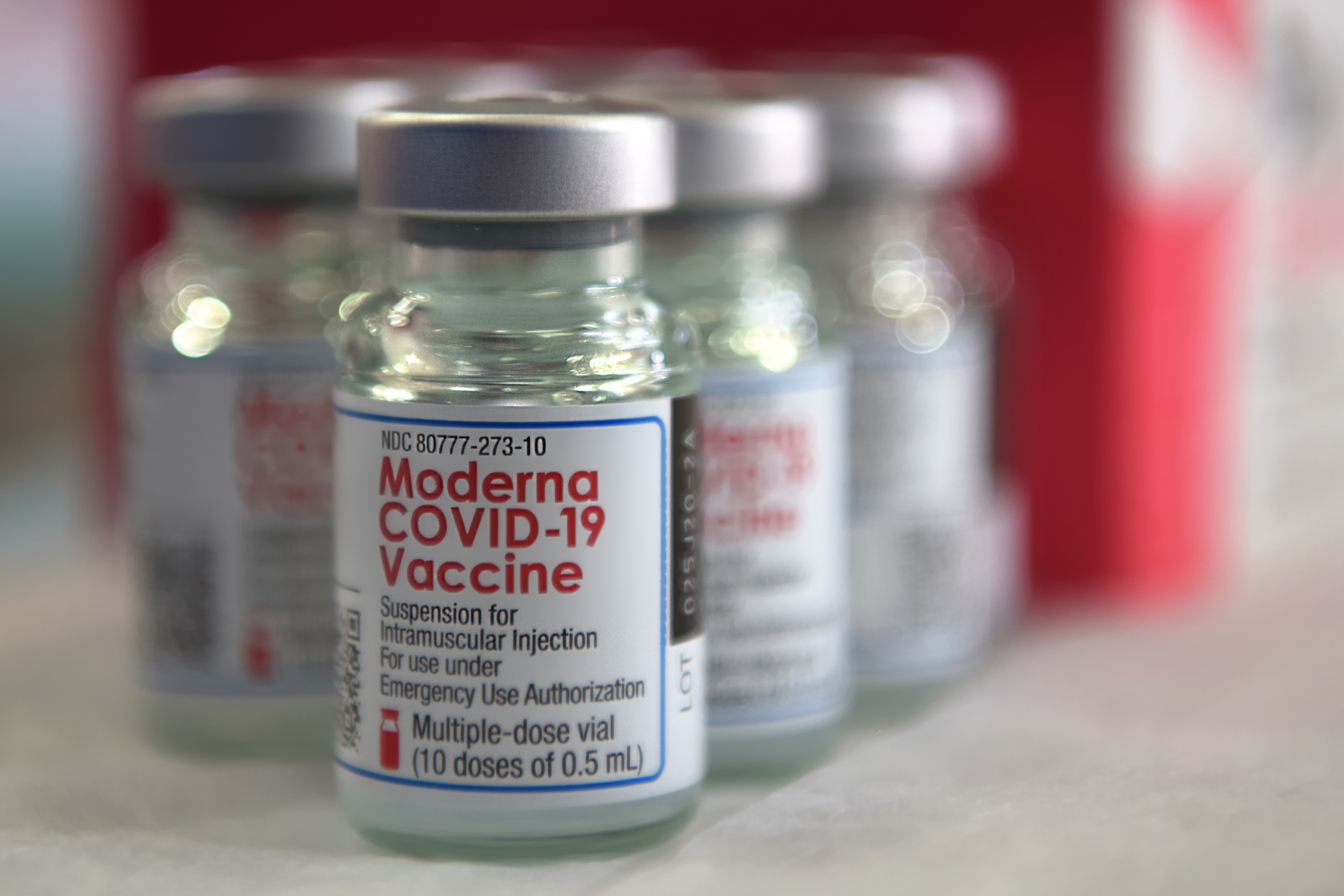
- Vials of the Moderna COVID-19 vaccine

Vaccine description
- Target: SARS-CoV-2
- Vaccine type: mRNA

Clinical data
- Trade names: Spikevax, others
- Other names: mRNA-1273, CX-024414, COVID-19 mRNA Vaccine Moderna, TAK-919, Moderna COVID‑19 Vaccine, COVID‑19 Vaccine Moderna, COVID-19 Vaccine Moderna Intramuscular Injection, elasomeran, COVID-19 Vaccine (mRNA), davesomeran, imelasomeran, andusomeran, CX-034476, CX-038839
- AHFS/Drugs.com: Monograph
- MedlinePlus: a621002
- License data: US DailyMed: Moderna COVID-19 Vaccine
- Pregnancy category: AU: B1
- Routes of administration: Intramuscular
- ATC code: J07BN01 (WHO)

Legal status
- Legal status: AU: S4 (Prescription only); BR: Approved (BA.4/5 and XBB.1.5); CA: ℞-only / Schedule D; UK: Marketing authorization granted; US: ℞-only; EU: Marketing authorization granted; Full list of Moderna vaccine authorizations

Identifiers
- CAS Number: 2430046-03-8; 2798905-80-1
- PubChem SID: 442064767
- DrugBank: DB15654; DB17091
- UNII: EPK39PL4R4; TYF7YW7ENF
- KEGG: D12114
- ChEMBL: ChEMBL4650491

The Moderna COVID‑19 vaccine, sold under the brand name Spikevax among others, is a COVID-19 vaccine developed by the American company Moderna, the United States National Institute of Allergy and Infectious Diseases (NIAID), and the Biomedical Advanced Research and Development Authority (BARDA). Depending on the jurisdiction, it is authorized for use in humans aged six months, twelve years, or eighteen years and older. The Moderna COVID‑19 vaccine provides protection against COVID-19, which is caused by infection by the SARS-CoV-2 virus. A different version of the Moderna COVID-19 vaccine, sold under the brand name Mnexspike (mRNA-1283), was approved for medical use in the United States in May 2025, and in the European Union in February 2026.

Spikevax is designed to be administered in two or three 0.5-mL doses given by intramuscular injection, primarily into the deltoid muscle, at an interval of at least 28 days apart. The World Health Organization advises an eight-week interval between doses to optimize efficacy. Additional booster doses are approved in some regions to maintain immunity. Clinical trials and real-world data have demonstrated the vaccine's high efficacy, with significant effectiveness observed two weeks post-administration of the second dose, offering 94% protection against Covid and robust defense against severe cases. The vaccine's efficacy spans various demographics, including age, sex, and those with high-risk medical conditions.

Spikevax is an mRNA vaccine composed of nucleoside-modified mRNA (modRNA) encoding a spike protein of SARS-CoV-2, which is encapsulated in lipid nanoparticles. In August and September 2022, bivalent versions of the vaccine (Moderna COVID-19 Vaccine, Bivalent) containing elasomeran/elasomeran 0-omicron (Spikevax Bivalent Zero/Omicron) were authorized for use as booster doses in individuals aged 18 or older in the United Kingdom, Switzerland, Australia, Canada, the European Union, and the United States. The second component of the version of the bivalent vaccine used in the United States is based on the Omicron BA.4/BA.5 variant, while the second component of the bivalent vaccine version used in other countries is based on the Omicron BA.1 variant. The vaccine's effectiveness against variants has been extensively studied, indicating varying degrees of protection. For instance, during the prevalence of the Delta variant, effectiveness against infection slightly decreased over time. The vaccine's longevity and continuous protection are under study, with ongoing research focusing on its duration of effectiveness, which remains partially undetermined as of the latest updates.

The safety profile of the vaccine is favorable, with common side effects including injection site pain, fatigue, and headaches. Severe reactions like anaphylaxis are exceedingly rare. Concerns regarding myocarditis, have been identified but are typically mild and manageable. The vaccine's formulation utilizes mRNA technology, encapsulated within lipid nanoparticles to ensure cellular uptake and immune system response.

== Medical uses ==
The Moderna COVID‑19 vaccine is used to provide protection against infection by the SARS‑CoV‑2 virus in order to prevent COVID‑19.

The vaccine is given by intramuscular injection into the deltoid muscle of the arm. The initial course consists of two doses. The World Health Organization (WHO) recommends an interval of eight weeks between doses.

A third, fourth, or fifth dose can be added in some countries.

=== Efficacy ===
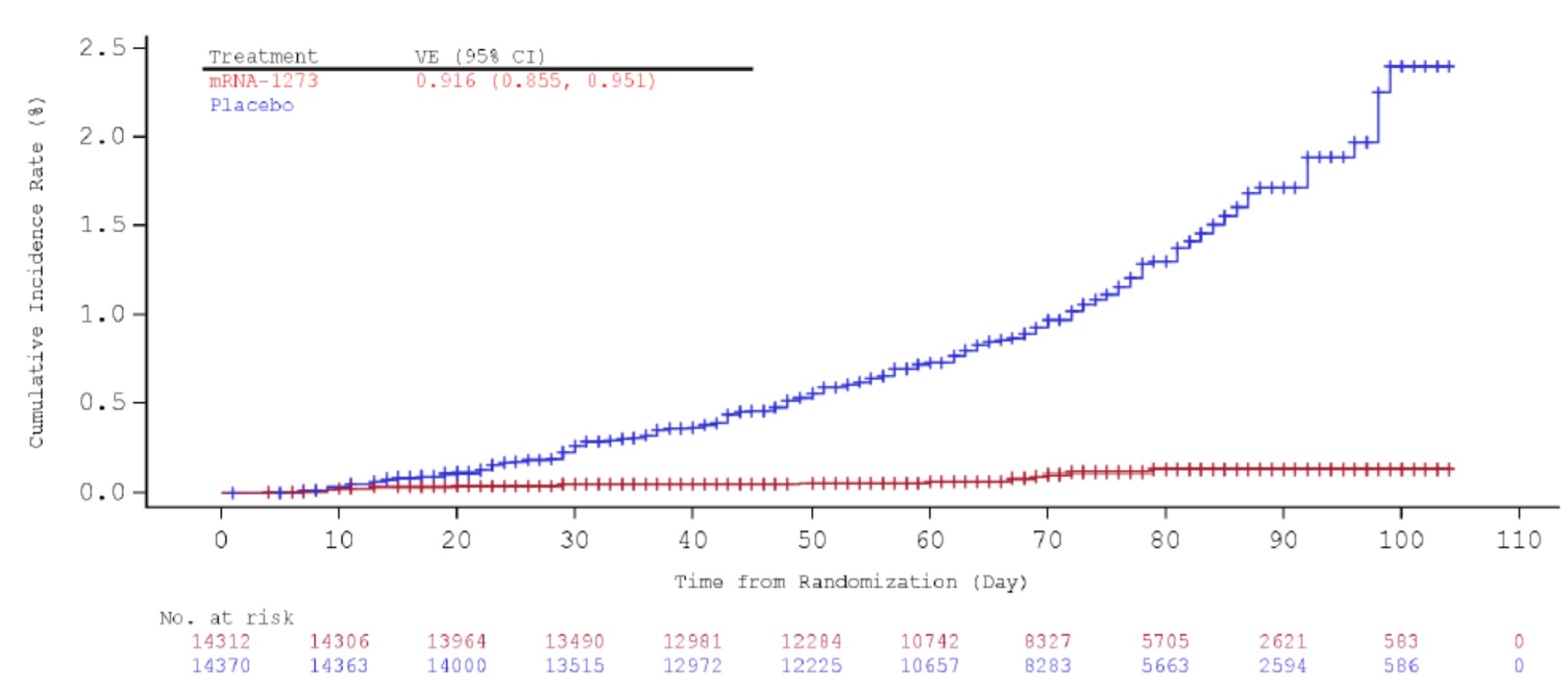
Cumulative Incidence Curves for the First COVID‑19 Occurrence (Moderna mRNA-1273 vaccine)

Evidence of vaccine efficacy starts about two weeks after the first dose. High efficacy is achieved with full immunization, two weeks after the second dose, and was evaluated at 94.1%: at the end of the vaccine study that led to emergency authorization in the US, there were eleven cases of COVID‑19 in the vaccine group (out of 15,181 people) versus 185 cases in the placebo group (15,170 people). Moreover, there were zero cases of severe COVID‑19 in the vaccine group, versus eleven in the placebo group. This efficacy has been described as "astonishing" and "borderline historic" for a respiratory virus vaccine, and it is similar to the efficacy of the Pfizer–BioNTech COVID-19 vaccine.

Efficacy estimates were similar across age groups, sexes, racial and ethnic groups, and participants with medical comorbidities associated with high risk of severe COVID‑19. Only individuals aged 18 or older were studied. Studies are underway to gauge efficacy and safety in children aged 0–11 (KidCOVE) and 12–17 (TeenCOVE).

A further study conducted by the US Centers for Disease Control and Prevention (CDC) between December 2020, and March 2021, on nearly 4 thousand health care personnel, first responders, and other essential and frontline workers concluded that under real-world conditions, mRNA vaccine effectiveness of full immunization (14 days or more after second dose) was 90% against SARS-CoV-2 infections, regardless of symptoms, and vaccine effectiveness of partial immunization (14 days or more after first dose but before second dose) was 80%.

The duration of protection provided by the vaccine is unknown as of April 2021, and a two-year followup study is underway to determine the duration.

Preliminary results from a phase III trial indicate that vaccine efficacy is durable, remaining at 93% six months after the second dose.

=== Effectiveness ===
A vaccine is generally considered effective if the estimate is ≥50% with a >30% lower limit of the 95% confidence interval. Effectiveness is generally expected to slowly decrease over time.

In August 2021, results from a study suggested that the effectiveness against infection decreased from 91% (81–96%) to 66% (26–84%) when the Delta variant became predominant in the US, which may be due to unmeasured and residual confounding related to a decline in vaccine effectiveness over time.

Initial effectiveness by variant
Doses	Severity of illness	Delta (Note: 21 December 2020 to 7 September 2021 in Qatar.)	Alpha (Note: 14 December 2020 to 19 April 2021 in Ontario, Canada.)	Gamma	Beta	Omicron	Others circulating previously
1	Asymptomatic	62% (−10 to 87%)	Not reported	Not reported	Not reported	Not reported	Not reported
1	Symptomatic	83% (65–91%)	61% (56–66%)	43% (22–59%)		Not reported	61% (53–67%)
1	Hospitalization	87% (−1 to 98%)	59% (39–73%)	56% (−9 to 82%)		Not reported	76% (46–90%)
2	Asymptomatic	54% (33–68%)	Not reported	Not reported	Not reported	Not reported	Not reported
2	Symptomatic	74% (66–80%)	90% (85–94%)	88% (61–96%)		Not reported	93% (87–96%)
2	Hospitalization	96% (72–100%)	94% (59–99%)	100% (Note: A confidence interval was not provided, so it is not possible to know the accuracy of this measurement.)		Not reported	90% (80–100%)

=== Specific populations ===
Limited data are available on the safety of the Moderna COVID‑19 vaccine during pregnancy. The initial study excluded pregnant women or discontinued them from vaccination upon a positive pregnancy test. Studies in animals found no safety concerns and clinical trials are underway to evaluate the safety and efficacy of COVID‑19 vaccines in pregnant women. Real-world observations through the CDC v-safe tracking program have not uncovered unusual numbers of adverse events or outcomes of interest. Based on the results of a preliminary study, the US CDC recommends that pregnant women get vaccinated with the COVID‑19 vaccine.

== Adverse effects ==
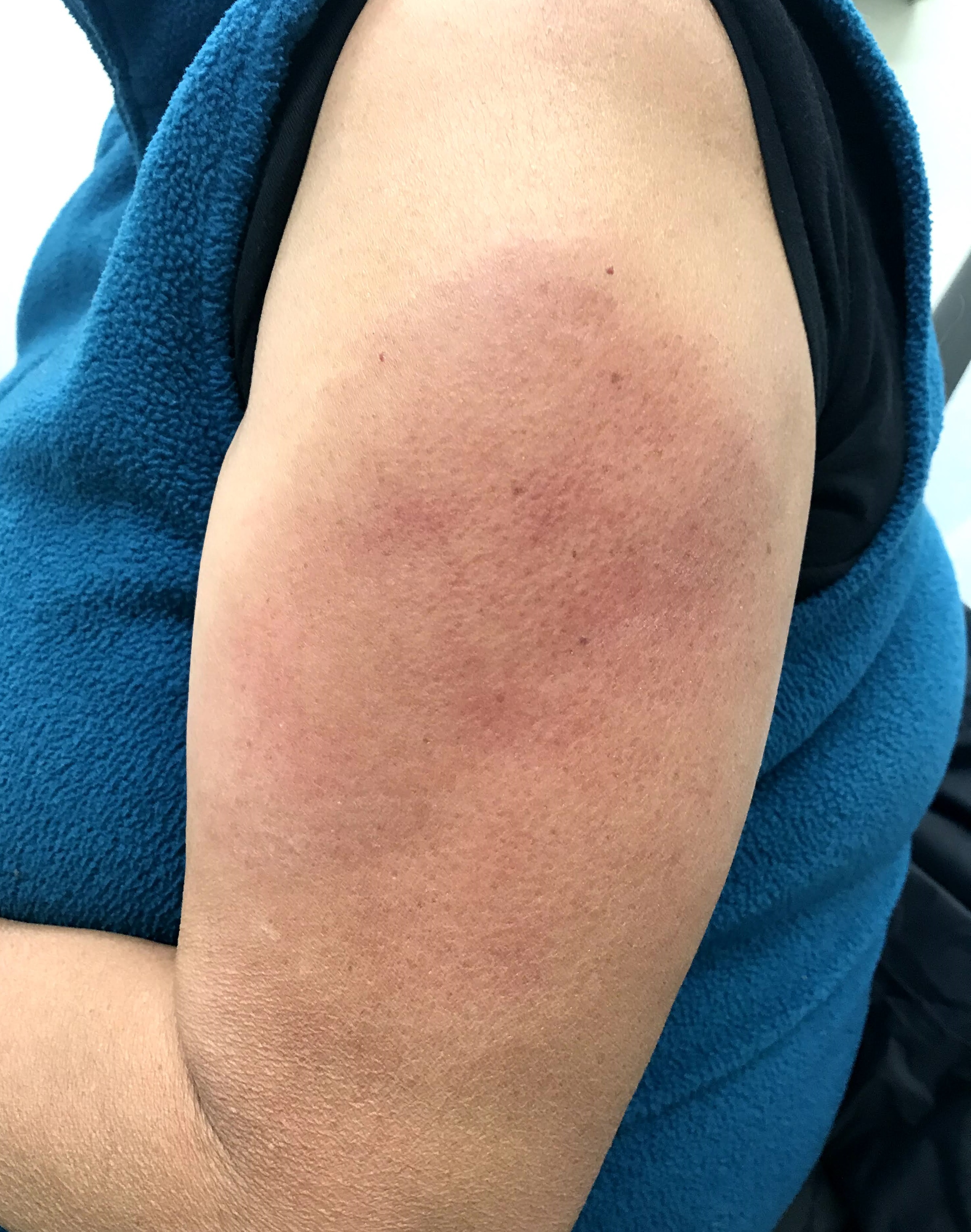
"Moderna arm", a non-serious skin reaction rarely seen ≈7 days after injection with the Moderna vaccine.

The World Health Organization (WHO) stated that "the safety data supported a favorable safety profile" and that the vaccine's AE (adverse event) profile "did not suggest any specific safety concerns". The most common adverse events were pain at the injection site, fatigue, headache, myalgia (muscle pain), and arthralgia (joint pain).

The US Centers for Disease Control and Prevention (CDC) has reported anaphylaxis (a severe allergic reaction) in 2.5 cases per million doses administered and has recommended a 15-minute observation period after injection. Delayed cutaneous reactions at injection sites resulting in rash-like erythemas have also been observed in rare cases but are not considered serious or contraindications to subsequent vaccination. The incidence rate for local adverse erythema is about 10.8%. In 1.9% of cases, redness may extend to a size of 100 mm or greater.

In June 2021, the US CDC confirmed that myocarditis or pericarditis occurs in about 13 of every 1 million young people, mostly male and over the age of 16, who received the Moderna or the Pfizer–BioNTech vaccine. Most affected individuals recover quickly with adequate treatment and rest.

Additional side effects include extensive swelling of the vaccinated limb.

== Pharmacology ==
Moderna's technology uses a nucleoside-modified messenger RNA (modRNA) compound codenamed mRNA-1273. The mRNA-1273 drug delivery system uses a PEGylated lipid nanoparticle drug delivery (LNP) system. Once the compound is inside a human cell, the mRNA links up with the cell's endoplasmic reticulum. The mRNA-1273 is encoded to trigger the cell into making a specific protein using the cell's normal manufacturing process. The vaccine encodes a version of the spike protein with a modification called 2P, in which the protein includes two stabilizing mutations in which the original amino acids are replaced with prolines, developed by researchers at the University of Texas at Austin and the National Institute of Allergy and Infectious Diseases' Vaccine Research Center. Once the protein is expelled from the cell, it is eventually detected by the immune system, which begins generating efficacious antibodies.

== Chemistry ==
The vaccine contains the following ingredients:

The active ingredient is an mRNA sequence containing a total of 4101 nucleotides that encodes the full-length SARS-CoV-2 spike (S) glycoprotein, with two mutations (K986P and V987P) designed to stabilize the pre-fusion conformation. The sequence is further optimized by:

- all uridines (U) substituted with N1-methylpseudouridine (U → m1Ψ),
- flanked by an artificial 5' untranslated region (UTR) and a 3' UTR derived from the human alpha globin gene (HBA1),
- introduction of two additional stop codons,
- terminated by a 3' poly(A) tail.

A putative sequence of the vaccine has been published on a forum for professional virologists, obtained by direct sequencing of residual vaccine material in used vials.

The vaccine mRNA is dissolved in an aqueous buffer containing tromethamine, tromethamine hydrochloride, sodium acetate, and sucrose. The mRNA is encapsulated in lipid nanoparticles that stabilize the mRNA and facilitate its entry into cells. The nanoparticles are manufactured from the following lipids:

- 1,2-distearoyl-sn-glycero-3-phosphocholine (DSPC),
- cholesterol,
- PEG2000-DMG (polyethylene glycol (PEG) 2000-dimyristoyl glycerol (DMG)), and
- SM-102

== Manufacturing ==
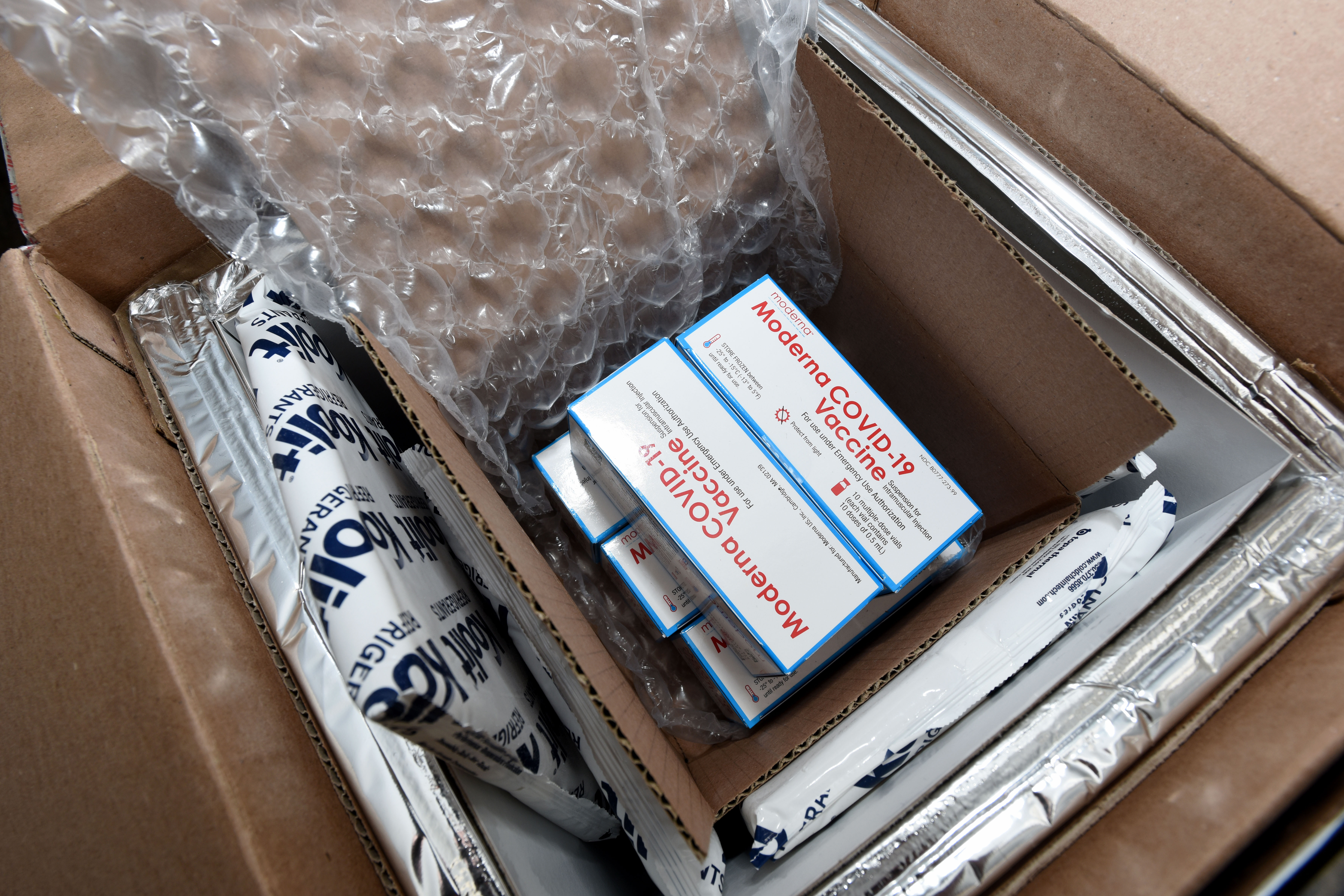
An insulated shipping container with Moderna vaccine boxes ensconced by cold packs

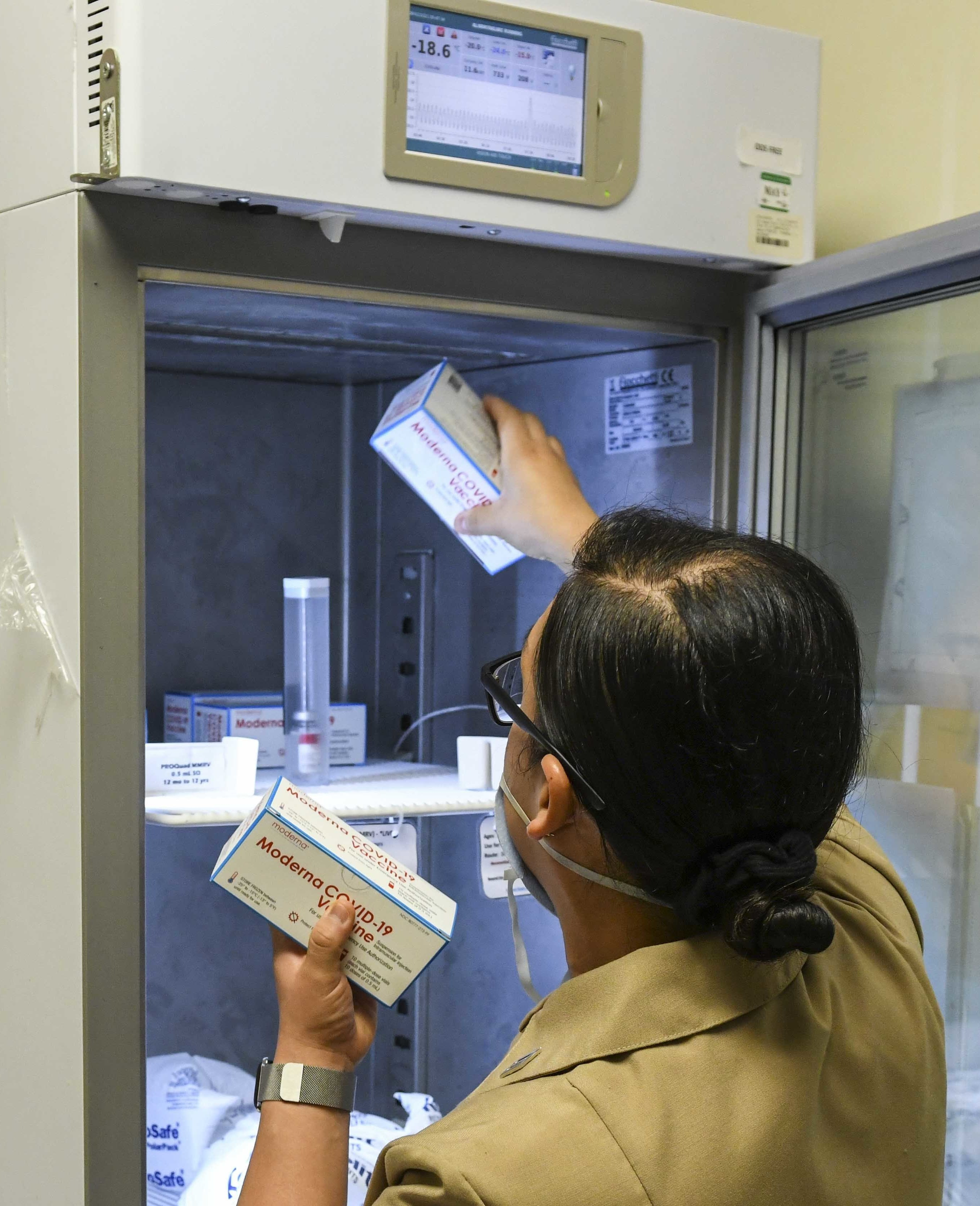
Moderna vaccine being stored in a conventional medical freezer

Moderna is relying extensively on contract manufacturing organizations to scale up its vaccine manufacturing process. The first step of the process—synthesis of DNA plasmids (to be used as a template for synthesis of mRNA)—has been handled by a contractor called Aldevron based in Fargo, North Dakota. For the remainder of the process, Moderna contracted with Lonza Group to manufacture the vaccine at facilities in Portsmouth, New Hampshire in the United States, and in Visp in Switzerland, and purchased the necessary lipid excipients from CordenPharma. Besides CMOs, Moderna also manufactures the vaccine at its own production facility in Norwood, Massachusetts. Another manufacturing site for the vaccines for the market outside the U.S. (since the end of 2021) is in Geleen in the Netherlands, produced by its manufacturing partner Lonza. Earlier, Lonza did produce the vaccine for the EU, U.K. and Canada at its site in Switzerland only, but had to cut projected deliveries to the U.K. and Canada earlier in 2021 due to production issues.

For the tasks of filling and packaging vials (fill and finish), Moderna entered into contracts with Catalent in the United States and Laboratorios Farmacéuticos Rovi in Spain. In April 2021, Moderna expanded its agreement with Catalent to increase manufacturing output at the latter's plant in Bloomington, Indiana. The expansion will allow Catalent to manufacture up to 400 vials per minute and fill an additional 80 million vials per year. Later that month, Moderna announced its plans to spend billions of dollars to boost production of its vaccines, potentially tripling the output in 2022, claiming as well that it would make no less than 800 million doses in 2021. The increase in production is in part attributed to improvements made by the company in manufacturing methods.

The Moderna news followed preliminary results from the Pfizer-BioNTech vaccine candidate, BNT162b2, with Moderna demonstrating similar efficacy, but requiring storage at the temperature of a standard medical refrigerator of 2–8 °C (36–46 °F) for up to thirty days or −20 °C (−4 °F) for up to four months, whereas the Pfizer-BioNTech candidate requires ultracold freezer storage between −80 and −60 °C (−112 and −76 °F). Low-income countries usually have cold chain capacity for only standard refrigerator storage, not ultracold freezer storage. In February 2021, the restrictions on the Pfizer vaccine were relaxed when the US Food and Drug Administration (FDA) updated the emergency use authorization (EUA) to permit undiluted frozen vials of the vaccine to be transported and stored at between −25 and −15 °C (−13 and 5 °F) for up to two weeks before use. The Moderna vaccine should not be stored at a temperature below −50 °C (−58 °F).

In November 2020, Nature reported that "While it's possible that differences in LNP formulations or mRNA secondary structures could account for the thermostability differences [between Moderna and BioNtech], many experts suspect both vaccine products will ultimately prove to have similar storage requirements and shelf lives under various temperature conditions."

== History ==
In June 2025, the European Medicines Agency announced that they are making data from the marketing authorization applications for COVID‑19 mRNA vaccines Comirnaty and Spikevax publicly available.

=== Original version ===
In January 2020, Moderna announced development of an RNA vaccine, codenamed mRNA-1273, to induce immunity to SARS-CoV-2.

Moderna received US$955 million from the Biomedical Advanced Research and Development Authority (BARDA), an office of the US Department of Health and Human Services. BARDA funded 100% of the cost of bringing the vaccine to FDA licensure.

The United States government provided $2.5 billion in total funding for the Moderna COVID‑19 vaccine (mRNA-1273). Private donors also made contributions to the vaccine's development. The Dolly Parton COVID-19 Research Fund contributed $1 million.

==== Phase I–II clinical trials ====
In March 2020, the phase I human trial of mRNA-1273 began in partnership with the US National Institute of Allergy and Infectious Diseases. In April, the US Biomedical Advanced Research and Development Authority (BARDA) allocated up to $483 million for Moderna's vaccine development. Plans for a phase II dosing and efficacy trial to begin in May were approved by the US Food and Drug Administration (FDA). Moderna signed a partnership with Swiss vaccine manufacturer Lonza Group, to supply 300 million doses per annum.

In May 2020, Moderna began a phase IIa clinical trial recruiting six hundred adult participants to assess safety and differences in antibody response to two doses of its candidate vaccine, mRNA-1273, a study expected to complete in 2021.

In July 2020, Moderna scientists published preliminary results of the phase I dose escalation clinical trial of mRNA-1273, showing dose-dependent induction of neutralizing antibodies against S1/S2 as early as 15 days post-injection. Mild to moderate adverse reactions, such as fever, fatigue, headache, muscle ache, and pain at the injection site were observed in all dose groups, but were common with increased dosage. The vaccine in low doses was deemed safe and effective in order to advance a phase III clinical trial using two 100-μg doses administered 29 days apart.

In July 2020, Moderna announced in a preliminary report that its Operation Warp Speed candidate had led to production of neutralizing antibodies in healthy adults in phase I clinical testing. "At the 100-microgram dose, the one Moderna is advancing into larger trials, all 15 patients experienced side effects, including fatigue, chills, headache, muscle pain, and pain at the site of injection." The troublesome higher doses were discarded in July from future studies.

In September 2021, a study funded by the National Institute of Allergy and Infectious Diseases reported a strong immune response after six months, even at low doses, suggesting that more doses could be deployed from a limited vaccine supply. Six months after low-dose vaccination, 67% of participants still had memory cytotoxic T cells, suggesting that immune memory is stable. The study also found that cross-reactive T cells acquired during infection with other coronaviruses that cause the common cold increased the response to the vaccine.

==== Phase III clinical trials ====
Moderna and the National Institute of Allergy and Infectious Diseases began a phase III trial in the US in July 2020, with a plan to enroll and assign thirty-thousand volunteers to two groups – one group receiving two 100-μg doses of mRNA-1273 vaccine and the other receiving a placebo of 0.9% sodium chloride. As of 7 August, more than 4,500 volunteers had enrolled.

In September 2020, Moderna published the detailed study plan for the clinical trial. In September 2020, CEO Stéphane Bancel said that, if the trial is successful, the vaccine might be available to the public as early as late March or early April 2021. As of October 2020, Moderna had completed the enrollment of 30,000 participants needed for its phase III trial. The US National Institutes of Health announced in November 2020, that overall trial results were positive.

Since September 2020, Moderna has used Roche Diagnostics' Elecsys Anti-SARS-CoV-2 S test, authorized by the US Food and Drug Administration (FDA) under an emergency use authorization (EUA) in November 2020. According to an independent supplier of clinical assays in microbiology, "this will facilitate the quantitative measurement of SARS-CoV-2 antibodies and help to establish a correlation between vaccine-induced protection and levels of anti-receptor binding domain (RBD) antibodies." The partnership was announced by Roche on 9 December 2020.

A review by the FDA in December 2020, of interim results of the phase III clinical trial on mRNA-1273 showed it to be safe and effective against COVID‑19 infection resulting in the issuance of an EUA by the FDA.

In February 2021, results from phase III clinical trial were published in the New England Journal of Medicine, indicating 94% efficacy in preventing COVID‑19 infection. Side effects included flu-like symptoms, such as pain at the injection site, fatigue, muscle pain, and headache. The clinical trial is ongoing and is set to conclude in late 2022.

Pregnant and breastfeeding women were also excluded from the initial trials used to obtain the emergency use authorization, though trials in those populations were expected to be performed in 2021.

In March 2021, in order to increase the span of vaccination beyond adults, Moderna started the clinical trials of vaccines on children age 6-months to 11-years-old in the US and in Canada (KidCove), in addition to the existing and fully-enrolled study on 12-17 year-olds (TeenCOVE).

Additional trials were completed—NCT04796896, NCT04649151, and NCT05436834.

==== Authorizations ====
===== Expedited =====
As of December 2020, the Moderna COVID‑19 vaccine was under evaluation for emergency authorization or approval by multiple countries which would enable rapid rollout of the vaccine in the United Kingdom, the European Union (EU), Canada, and the United States.

In December 2020, the Moderna COVID‑19 vaccine was authorized by the US Food and Drug Administration (FDA) under an emergency use authorization (EUA) for people aged 18 years of age and older. This is the first product from Moderna that has been authorized by the FDA. In June 2022, the EUA was expanded to include people aged six months through sixteen years of age. In April 2023, the authorization for the original, monovalent, version of the vaccine in the US was withdrawn. As of April 2023, only the bivalent (Original and Omicron BA.4/BA.5) version of the vaccine is authorized in the US.

In December 2020, the Moderna COVID‑19 vaccine was authorized by Health Canada.

In January 2021, the Moderna COVID‑19 vaccine was authorized for use in Israel by its Ministry of Health.

In February 2021, the Moderna COVID‑19 vaccine was authorized for use in Singapore by its Health Sciences Authority.

In April 2021, the World Health Organization (WHO) granted emergency use listing.

In May 2021, the Moderna COVID‑19 vaccine was authorized for emergency use in the Philippines by the Philippines Food and Drug Administration.

In 2020, Moderna partnered with Takeda Pharmaceutical Company, and the Japan Ministry of Health, Labour and Welfare (MHLW). The vaccine is known as "COVID-19 Vaccine Moderna Intramuscular Injection". In May 2021, COVID‑19 Vaccine Moderna Intramuscular Injection (formerly TAK-919) was authorized for emergency use in Japan.

In June 2021, the Moderna COVID‑19 vaccine was authorized for use in India by the Drugs Controller General of India. The same day, the vaccine was also approved by the Ministry of Health of Vietnam for emergency use in the country.

In August 2021, Malaysia's National Pharmaceutical Regulatory Agency (NPRA) gave conditional registration for emergency use of the Moderna COVID‑19 vaccine.

===== Standard =====
In January 2021, the Committee for Medicinal Products for Human Use (CHMP) of the European Medicines Agency (EMA) recommended granting conditional marketing authorization and the recommendation was accepted by the European Commission the same day. In July 2021, the EMA extended the use of the COVID‑19 Vaccine Moderna to include people aged 12 to 17.

In January 2021, Swissmedic granted temporary authorization for the Moderna COVID-19 mRNA Vaccine in Switzerland.

In March 2021, the Medicines and Healthcare products Regulatory Agency (MHRA) granted conditional marketing authorization in the United Kingdom.

In August 2021, Spikevax was granted provisional approval in Australia. The approval was updated in September 2021, to include people aged twelve years of age and older.

The Moderna Spikevax COVID-19 vaccine was authorized in Canada in September 2021, for people aged twelve years of age and older.

The Moderna Spikevax COVID-19 vaccine was authorized in the US in January 2022, for people aged 18 years of age and older.

The Moderna Spikevax Bivalent Zero/Omicron vaccine was approved for medical use in the United Kingdom in August 2022.

In September 2022, the CHMP of the EMA recommended converting the conditional marketing authorizations of the vaccine into standard marketing authorizations. The recommendation covers all existing and upcoming adapted Spikevax vaccines, including the recently approved adapted Spikevax bivalent Original/Omicron BA.1.

In July 2025, Spikevax was fully approved in the US for use in children aged six months through eleven years of age who are at increased risk for COVID-19 disease.

In September 2025, Mnexspike was authorized for medical use in Canada.

In December 2025, the CHMP adopted a positive opinion, recommending the granting of a marketing authorization for the medicinal product Mnexspike, intended for the prevention of COVID-19 in people from twelve years of age. The applicant for this medicinal product is Moderna Biotech, Spain, S.L. Mnexspike was authorized for medical use in the European Union in February 2026.

==== Boosters ====
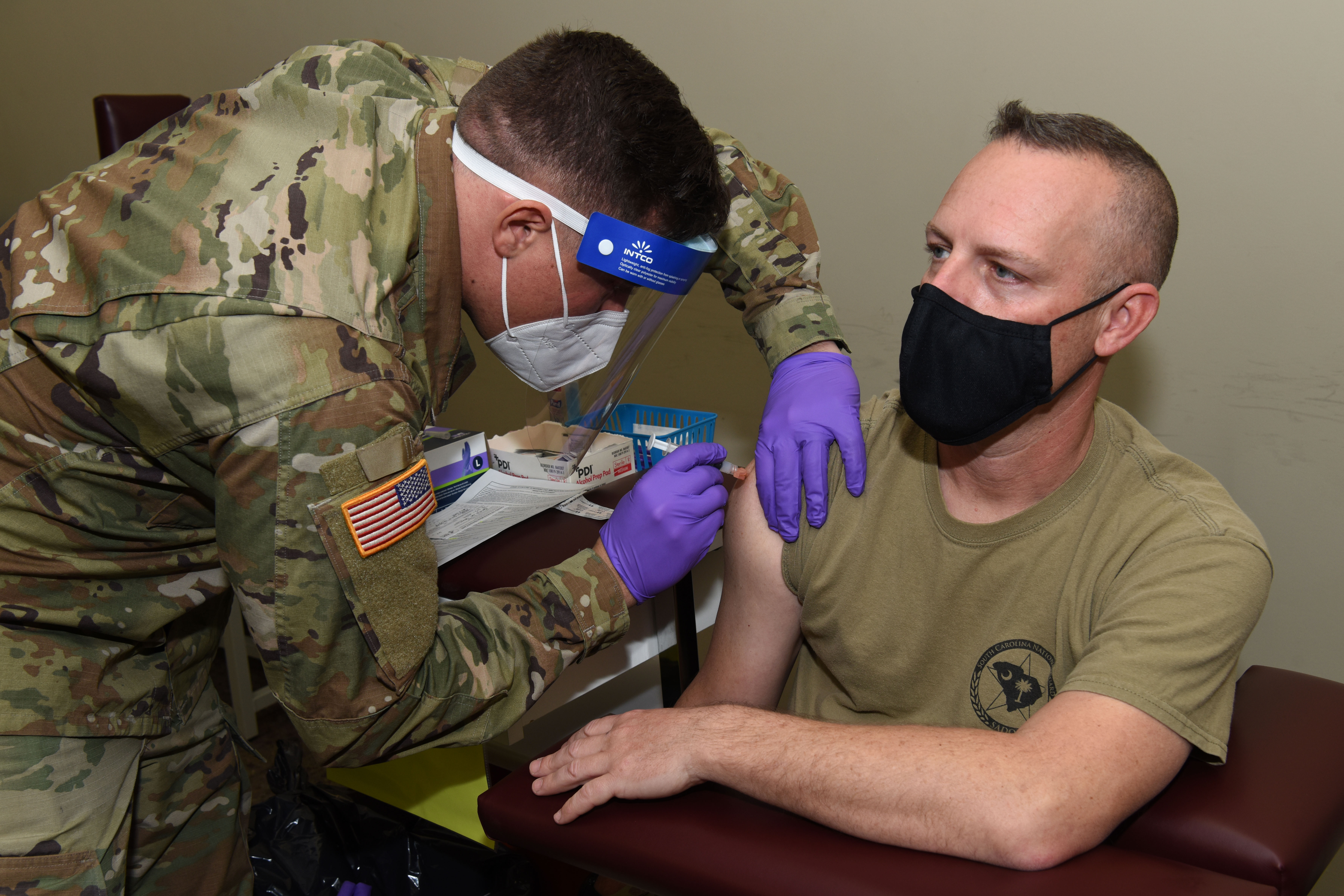
US military personnel being administered the Moderna vaccine in December 2020

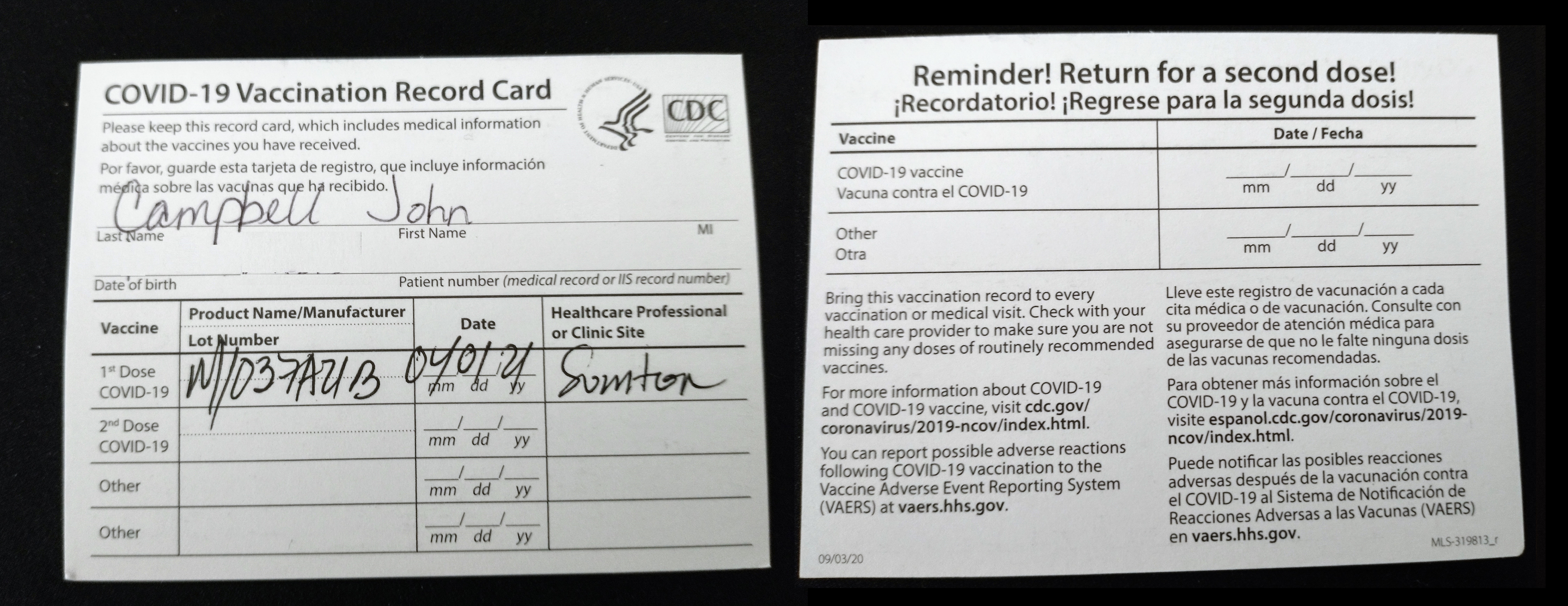
CDC COVID-19 vaccine card showing the first Moderna shot.

In January 2021, Moderna announced that it would offer a third dose of its vaccine to people who were vaccinated twice in its phase I trial. The booster would be made available to participants six to twelve months after they got their second dose. The company said it may also study a third shot in participants from its phase III trial, if antibody persistence data warranted it. It also started testing to see if a third shot of the existing vaccine could be used to fend off the virus variants.

In August 2021, the US Food and Drug Administration (FDA) and the US Centers for Disease Control and Prevention (CDC) authorized the use of an additional mRNA vaccine dose for immunocompromised individuals.

In September 2021, the Committee for Medicinal Products for Human Use (CHMP) of the European Medicines Agency (EMA) started evaluating the use of a booster dose of the Moderna COVID-19 vaccine to be given at least six months after the second dose in people aged twelve years and older.

In October 2021, the European Medicines Agency (EMA) stated that people with "severely weakened" immune systems can receive an extra dose of either the Pfizer–BioNTech COVID-19 vaccine or the Moderna COVID-19 vaccine starting at least 28 days after their second dose.

In October 2021, the US Food and Drug Administration (FDA) and the Centers for Disease Control and Prevention (CDC) authorized the use of either homologous or heterologous vaccine booster doses. The authorization was expanded to include all adults in November 2021.

=== Variants ===
In January 2021, Moderna started development of a new form of its vaccine, called mRNA-1273.351, that could be used as a booster shot against the Beta variant (lineage B.1.351). In February 2021, Moderna announced that it had manufactured and shipped sufficient amounts of mRNA-1273.351 to the National Institutes of Health to run phase I clinical trials. Moderna also investigated a multivalent booster, mRNA-1273.211, which combines a 50-50 mix of mRNA-1273 and mRNA-1273.351.

A bivalent version of the vaccine containing elasomeran/imelasomeran (Spikevax bivalent Original/Omicron) was approved for use in the United Kingdom and in Australia in August 2022. It was approved for use in Canada in September 2022.

In October 2022, the FDA amended the authorization for the bivalent booster to cover people aged six years of age and older. In December 2022, the FDA amended the authorization for the bivalent booster to cover people aged six months and older.

==== XBB.1.5 monovalent vaccine ====
In September 2023, the FDA approved an updated a monovalent (single) component Omicron variant XBB.1.5 version of the vaccine (Spikevax 2023-2024 formula) as a single dose for individuals aged twelve years of age and older; and authorized the Moderna COVID-19 Vaccine 2023-2024 formula under emergency use for individuals aged 6 months through 11 years of age. The updated version was tested in a small human trial of 101 participants; 50 received the monovalent XBB.1.5 version, compared to 51 who received a version containing XBB.1.5, BA.4 and BA.5. All participants had previously received four doses of older formulations of the Moderna COVID-19 vaccine. The safety profile of the authorized XBB.1.5 was found to be "consistent with previously authorized vaccines." The approvals and emergency authorizations for the bivalent version of the vaccine were revoked. Health Canada authorized the Moderna Spikevax COVID-19 vaccine (Omicron XBB.1.5 subvariant) (andusomeran) in September 2023. The MHRA approved the use of the Moderna (Spikevax) XBB.1.5 vaccine in September 2023.

==== JN.1 monovalent vaccine ====
In September 2024, the UK's Medicines and Healthcare products Regulatory Agency (MHRA) approved Moderna's JN.1-adapted COVID-19 vaccine for use in adults and children aged six months and older.

In September 2024, the European Union authorized the Spikevax JN.1 vaccine.

In September 2024, Swissmedic authorized the Spikevax JN.1 vaccine.

In September 2024, the Taiwan Food & Drug Administration authorized the Spikevax JN.1 vaccine.

==== KP.2 monovalent vaccine ====
In August 2024, the FDA approved and granted emergency authorization for a monovalent Omicron KP.2 version of the Moderna COVID-19 vaccine. The approval of Spikevax (COVID-19 Vaccine, mRNA) (2024-2025 Formula) was granted to ModernaTX Inc. and the EUA amendment for the Moderna COVID-19 Vaccine (2024-2025 Formula) was issued to ModernaTX Inc.

== Society and culture ==
About 155 million doses of the Moderna COVID-19 vaccine, including about 3.1 million doses in children and adolescents (below 18 years of age) were administered in the EU/EEA from authorization to 26 June 2022.

=== Brand names ===
mRNA-1273 was the code name during development and testing, elasomeran is the international nonproprietary name (INN), and Spikevax is the brand name.

Davesomeran is the INN for the BA.5 variant in the bivalent version of the vaccine. Andusomeran is the INN for the XBB 1.5 variant version of the vaccine.

=== Economics ===
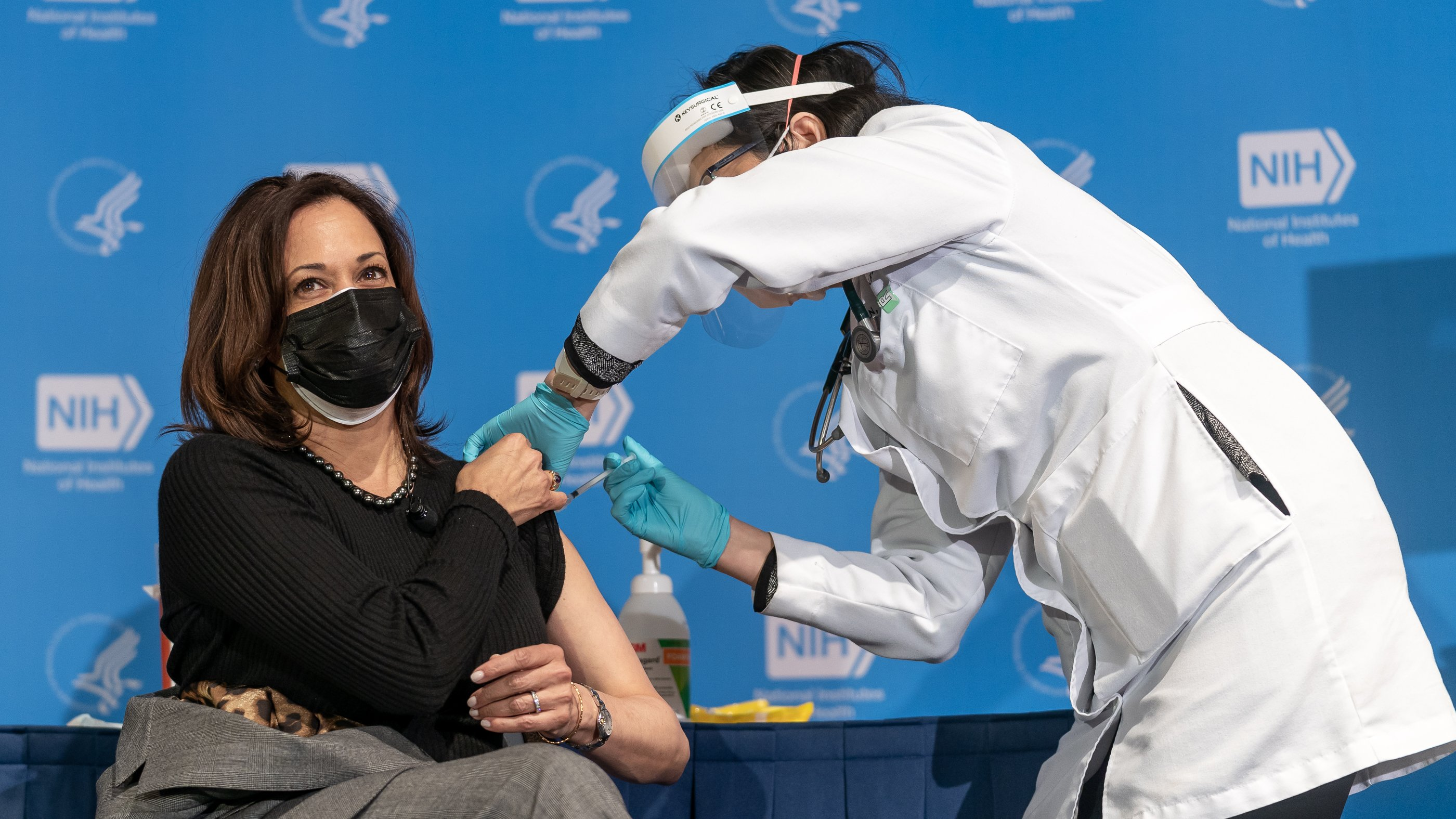
Kamala Harris, Vice President of the United States, receiving her second dose of the Moderna vaccination in January 2021.

In June 2020, Singapore signed a pre-purchase agreement for Moderna, reportedly paying a price premium in order to secure early stock of vaccines, although the government declined to provide the actual price and quantity, citing commercial sensitivities and confidentiality clauses.

In August 2020, the US government signed an agreement to buy 100 million doses of Moderna's anticipated vaccine, which the Financial Times said Moderna planned to price at US$50–60 per course. In November 2020, Moderna said it will charge governments who purchase its vaccine between US$25 and US$37 per dose while the EU is seeking a price of under US$25 per dose for the 160 million doses it plans to purchase from Moderna.

In 2020, Moderna obtained purchase agreements for mRNA-1273 with the European Union for 160 million doses and with Canada for up to 56 million doses. In December 2020, a tweet by the Belgium Budget State Secretary revealed the E.U. would pay US$18 per dose, while The New York Times reported that the US would pay US$15 per dose.

Moderna reported revenue of US$200 million from its COVID‑19 vaccine in 2020, and $17.7 billion in 2021.

=== Paused vaccinations ===
Out of concern that the vaccine may increase the risk of myocarditis in young people under age 30, Finland, Sweden, Germany, and France recommended Moderna vaccinations not be used for this age group in October/November 2021.

=== Controversies ===
In May 2020, after releasing partial and non-peer-reviewed results for only eight of 45 candidates in a preliminary pre-phase I stage human trial directly to financial markets, the CEO announced on CNBC an immediate $1.25 billion rights issue to raise funds for the company, at a $30 billion valuation, while Stat said, "Vaccine experts say Moderna didn't produce data critical to assessing COVID‑19 vaccine."

In July 2020, disputes between Moderna and government scientists over the company's unwillingness to share data from the clinical trials were revealed.

Moderna also faced criticism for failing to recruit people of color in clinical trials.

In August 2021, the US Department of Health and Human Services announced a plan to offer a booster dose eight months after the second dose, citing evidence of reduced protection against mild and moderate disease and the possibility of reduced protection against severe disease, hospitalization, and death. Scientists and the WHO reaffirmed the lack of evidence on the need for a booster dose for healthy people and that the vaccine remains effective against severe disease months after administration. In a statement, the WHO and SAGE said that, while protection against infection may be diminished, protection against severe disease will likely be retained due to cell-mediated immunity. Research into optimal timing for boosters is still ongoing, and a booster too early may lead to less robust protection.

==== Misinformation ====
Videos on video-sharing platforms circulated around May 2021 showing people having magnets stick to their arms after receiving the vaccine, purportedly demonstrating the conspiracy theory that vaccines contain microchips, but these videos have been debunked.

In November 2021, a White House correspondent for the conservative outlet Newsmax falsely tweeted that the Moderna vaccine contained luciferase "so that you can be tracked."

=== Patent litigation ===
The PEGylated lipid nanoparticle (LNP) drug delivery system of mRNA-1273 has been the subject of ongoing patent litigation with Arbutus Biopharma, from whom Moderna had previously licensed LNP technology. On 4 September 2020, Nature Biotechnology reported that Moderna had lost a key challenge in the ongoing case.
