= OncoDNA =

- Company type: Pharmaceutical and medical
- Founded: December 2012; 13 years ago
- Founder: Jean-Pol Detiffe
- Headquarters: Gosselies, Belgium
- Products: OncoDEEP, OncoSTRAT&GO, and OncoSELECT
- Website: http://www.oncodna.com/

OncoDNA is a Belgium-based company founded in December 2012 focusing on precision medicine in oncology. The company aims to provide cancer molecular profiling to individualize therapy decisions.

In September 2016, OncoDNA raised EUR 7.7 million in private equity. The new shares were subscribed by both the historical shareholders (IPG/bio.be, Invest4OncoDNA, Sambrinvest, and Vinsovier) as well as a group of four new investors (Sofinim NV, an affiliate of Ackermans & van Haaren, SRIW, CPH, and Inventures).

In 2015, the company was recognized by Ernst & Young in Belgium as the "Promising Enterprise of the Year," a category in their "Entrepreneurs of the Year" awards. The company was also awarded Most Disruptive Innovator of 2015 by Deloitte’s Fast 50 jury.

In April 2014, OncoDNA was selected for the multi-year analysis research program AURORA conducted by BIG, that aims to significantly improve the life of patients with metastatic or locally relapsed breast cancer. The project, which focuses on both the development of treatments targeting specific molecular aberrations and a better understanding of metastatic disease, will use OncoDEEP to perform cancer related targeted gene sequencing. Initially, 1300 women and men treated in about 60 hospitals spread across 15 European countries are expected to take part in AURORA.

François Blondel sits on the board of directors of OncoDNA.
