= Hans-Georg Rammensee =

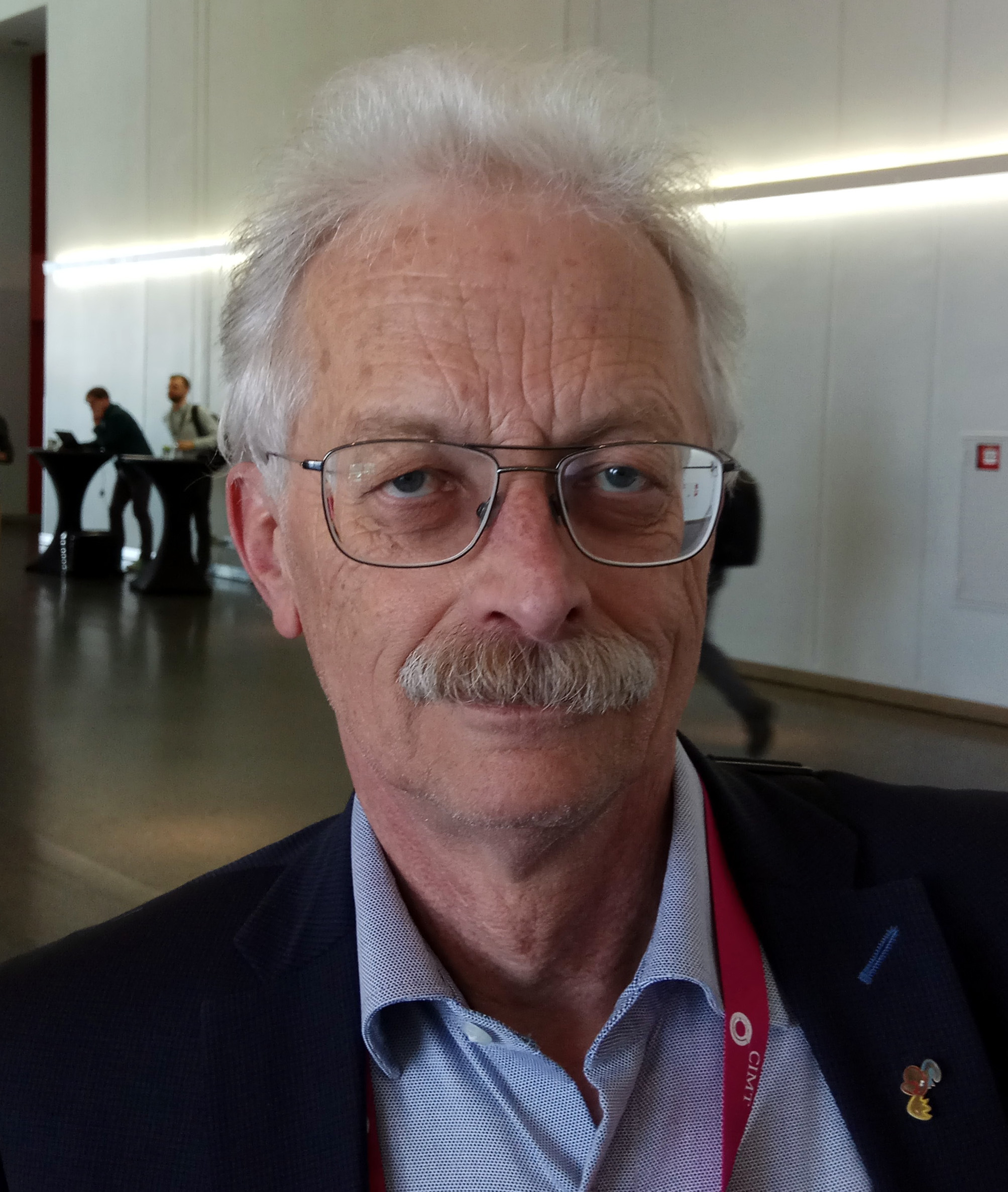
- Rammensee in 2019
- Born: 12 April 1953 (age 73)
- Citizenship: Germany
- Education: University of Tübingen
- Occupation: immunologist
- Employer: University of Tübingen
- Scientific career
- Thesis: Minor histocompatibility antigens (1982)
- Doctoral advisor: Jan Klein

Hans-Georg Rammensee (born 12 April 1953) is a German immunologist and cancer researcher. He has been Chair Professor and Head of the Department of Immunology at the University of Tübingen since 1996. Rammensee has contributed essentially to the research fields of MHC biology and tumor immunology and to the development of cancer immunotherapies.

== Life ==
Rammensee studied Biology at the University of Tübingen and worked as a PhD student at the Max Planck Institute for Biology in Tübingen. After gaining his doctorate in 1982 he initially worked as a post-doctoral research fellow at Scripps Research Institute, La Jolla, USA. In 1985 he moved as a scientific member to the Basel Institute for Immunology, Basel, Switzerland. Two years later Rammensee returned to Max Planck Institute for Biology as a group leader at the department of immunogenetics. 1993 he became head of department at the Tumor-Virus-Immunology Section of the German Cancer Research Center, Heidelberg, Germany. The same year he was appointed professor at the Faculty of Theoretical Medicine of Heidelberg University. He has been a Full Professor at the University of Tübingen and Chair of the Department of Immunology at the Institute for Cell Biology since 1996.

== Research ==
Since the late 1970s, Rammensee has been focusing on immunology with the specific aim of using tumor immunology to fight against cancer. He has contributed to genetics and immune regulation as well as to the understanding of minor H antigens, T cells and the major histocompatibility complex (MHC). His group has systematically developed bioinformatics tools for this purpose. In recent years, Rammensee has combined basic research on MHC biology with translational research, thus bringing tumor immunology into clinical practice. Currently he is focusing on the development of individualized cancer immunotherapy. In 2000 and 2010, Rammensee co-founded three research-based companies. Immatics is involved in the development of cancer immunotherapies, CureVac develops therapies based on messenger RNA (mRNA); synimmune on recombinant antibodies.

== Awards ==
- Ernst Jung Prize for Medicine, 2016
- German Cancer Aid Award, 2013
- Hansen Family Award, 2013
- Advanced Grant of the European Research Council, 2013
- Paul Ehrlich and Ludwig Darmstaedter Prize, 1996
- Robert Koch Prize, 1993
- Gottfried Wilhelm Leibniz Prize, 1992
- Heinz Maier Leibnitz Prize, 1988

== Publications ==
- Schuster H, Peper JK, Bösmüller HC, Röhle K, Backert L, Bilich T, Ney B, Löffler MW, Kowalewski DJ, Trautwein N, Rabsteyn A, Engler T, Braun S, Haen SP, Walz JS, Schmid-Horch B, Brucker SY, Wallwiener D, Kohlbacher O, Fend F, Rammensee HG, Stevanović S, Staebler A, Wagner P. The immunopeptidomic landscape of ovarian carcinomas. Proc Natl Acad Sci U S A. 2017 Nov 14;114(46):E9942-E9951. doi: 10.1073/pnas.1707658114.
- Kowalewski DJ, Schuster H, Backert L, Berlin C, Kahn S, Kanz L, Salih HR, Rammensee HG, Stevanovic S, Stickel JS. HLA ligandome analysis identifies the underlying specificities of spontaneous antileukemia immune responses in chronic lymphocytic leukemia (CLL). Proc Natl Acad Sci U S A. 2015 Jan 13;112(2):E166-75. doi: 10.1073/pnas.1416389112. Epub 2014 Dec 29. Erratum in: Proc Natl Acad Sci U S A. 2015 Nov 10;112(45):E6258-60. Proc Natl Acad Sci U S A. 2015 Nov 10;112(45):E6254-6
- Gubin MM, Zhang X, Schuster H, Caron E, Ward JP, Noguchi T, Ivanova Y, Hundal J, Arthur CD, Krebber WJ, Mulder GE, Toebes M, Vesely MD, Lam SS, Korman AJ, Allison JP, Freeman GJ, Sharpe AH, Pearce EL, Schumacher TN, Aebersold R, Rammensee HG, Melief CJ, Mardis ER, Gillanders WE, Artyomov MN, Schreiber RD. Checkpoint blockade cancer immunotherapy targets tumour-specific mutant antigens. Nature. 2014 Nov 27;515(7528):577-81. doi: 10.1038/nature13988
- Britten CM, Singh-Jasuja H, Flamion B, Hoos A, Huber C, Kallen KJ, Khleif SN, Kreiter S, Nielsen M, Rammensee HG, Sahin U, Hinz T, Kalinke U. The regulatory landscape for actively personalized cancer immunotherapies. Nat Biotechnol. 2013 Oct;31(10):880-2. doi: 10.1038/nbt.2708
- Weinschenk T, Gouttefangeas C, Schirle M, Obermayr F, Walter S, Schoor O, Kurek R, Loeser W, Bichler KH, Wernet D, Stevanović S, Rammensee HG. Integrated functional genomics approach for the design of patient-individual antitumor vaccines. Cancer Res. 2002 Oct 15;62(20):5818-27
- Hoerr I, Obst R, Rammensee HG, Jung G. In vivo application of RNA leads to induction of specific cytotoxic T lymphocytes and antibodies. Eur J Immunol. 2000 Jan;30(1):1–7
- Rammensee H, Bachmann J, Emmerich NP, Bachor OA, Stevanović S. SYFPEITHI: database for MHC ligands and peptide motifs. Immunogenetics. 1999 Nov;50(3-4):213-9. Review
- Falk K, Rötzschke O, Stevanović S, Jung G, Rammensee HG. Allele-specific motifs revealed by sequencing of self-peptides eluted from MHC molecules. Nature. 1991 May 23;351(6324):290-6.
- Rötzschke O, Falk K, Deres K, Schild H, Norda M, Metzger J, Jung G, Rammensee HG. Isolation and analysis of naturally processed viral peptides as recognized by cytotoxic T cells. Nature. 1990 Nov 15;348(6298):252-4
- Deres K, Schild H, Wiesmüller KH, Jung G, Rammensee HG. In vivo priming of virus-specific cytotoxic T lymphocytes with synthetic lipopeptide vaccine. Nature. 1989 Nov 30;342(6249):561-4

== See also ==
- Cancer immunotherapy
