= MRNA vaccine =

Type of vaccine

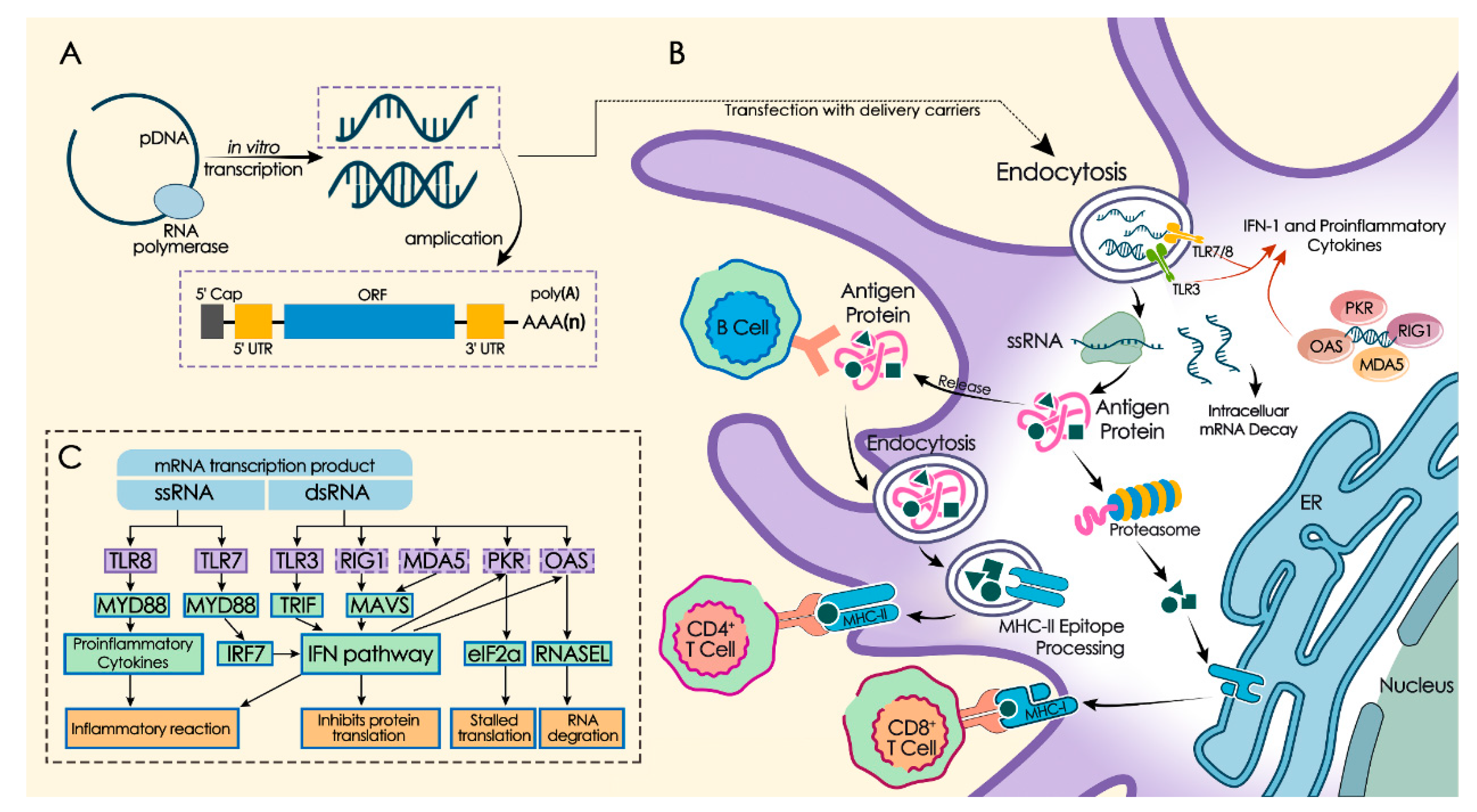
mRNA in vitro transcription, innate and adaptive immunity activation

An mRNA vaccine is a type of vaccine that uses a copy of a molecule called messenger RNA (mRNA) to produce an immune response. The vaccine delivers molecules of antigen-encoding mRNA into cells, which use the designed mRNA as a blueprint to build foreign protein that would normally be produced by a pathogen (such as a virus) or by a cancer cell. These protein molecules stimulate an adaptive immune response that teaches the body to identify and destroy the corresponding pathogen or cancer cells. The mRNA is delivered by a co-formulation of the RNA encapsulated in lipid nanoparticles that protect the RNA strands and help their absorption into the cells.

Video showing how vaccination with an mRNA vaccine works

Reactogenicity, the tendency of a vaccine to produce adverse reactions, is similar to that of conventional non-RNA vaccines. People susceptible to an autoimmune response may have an adverse reaction to messenger RNA vaccines. The advantages of mRNA vaccines over traditional vaccines are ease of design, speed and lower cost of production, the induction of both cellular and humoral immunity, and lack of interaction with the genomic DNA. While some messenger RNA vaccines, such as the Pfizer–BioNTech COVID-19 vaccine, have the disadvantage of requiring ultracold storage before distribution, other mRNA vaccines, such as the Moderna vaccine, do not have such requirements.

In RNA therapeutics, messenger RNA vaccines have attracted considerable interest as COVID-19 vaccines. In December 2020, Pfizer–BioNTech and Moderna obtained authorization for their mRNA-based COVID-19 vaccines. On 2 December, the UK Medicines and Healthcare products Regulatory Agency (MHRA) became the first medicines regulator to approve an mRNA vaccine, authorizing the Pfizer–BioNTech vaccine for widespread use. In December 2020, the US Food and Drug Administration (FDA) issued an emergency use authorization for the Pfizer–BioNTech vaccine and a week later similarly authorized the Moderna vaccine. In 2023 the Nobel Prize in Physiology or Medicine was awarded to Katalin Karikó and Drew Weissman for their discoveries concerning modified nucleosides that enabled the development of effective mRNA vaccines against COVID-19.

== History ==
=== Early research ===
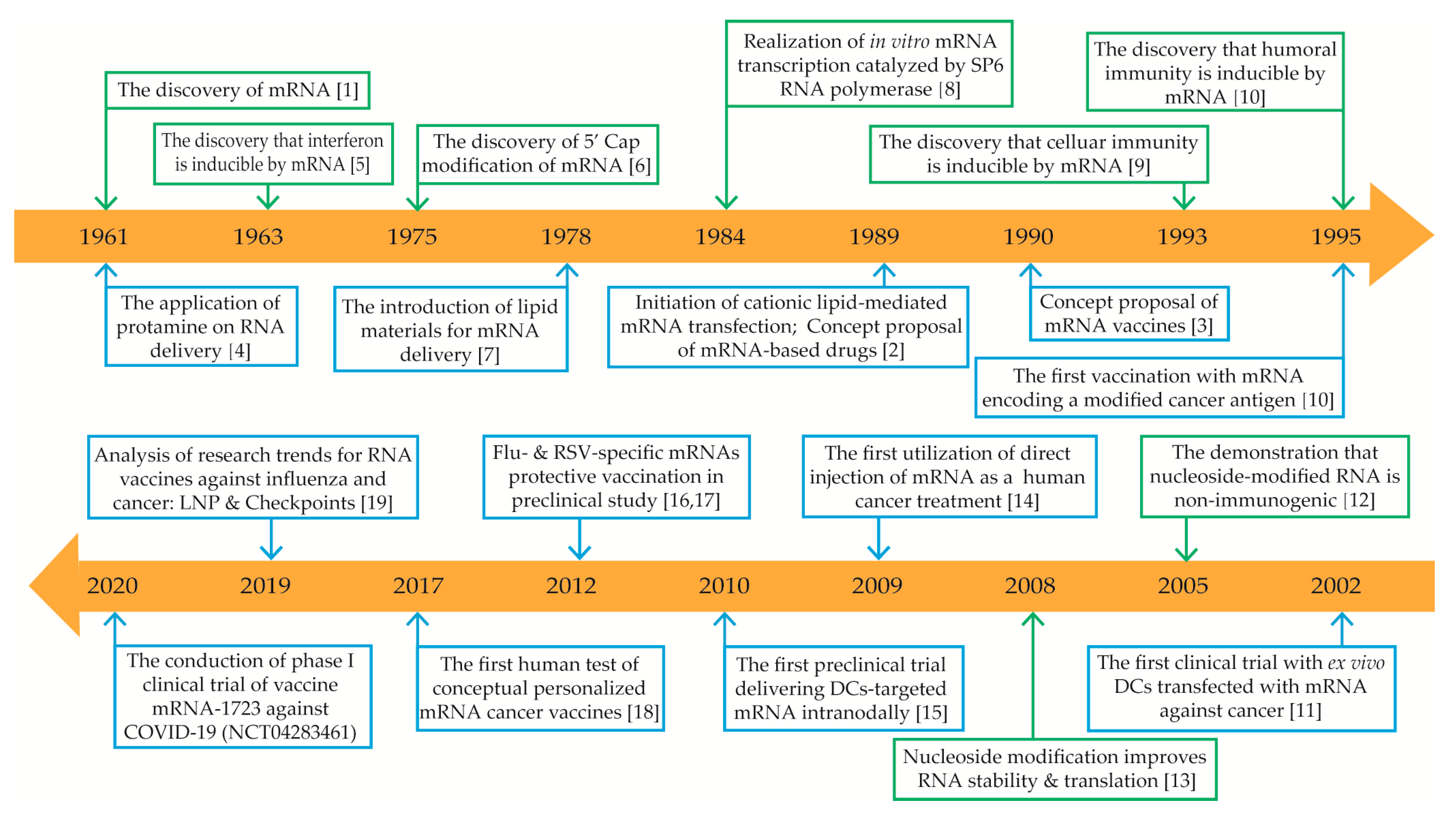
Timeline of some key discoveries and advances in the development of mRNA-based drug technology

The first successful transfection of designed mRNA packaged within a liposomal nanoparticle into a cell was published in 1989. "Naked" (or unprotected) lab-made mRNA was injected a year later into the muscle of mice. These studies were the first evidence that in vitro transcribed mRNA with a chosen gene was able to deliver the genetic information to produce a desired protein within living cell tissue and led to the concept proposal of messenger RNA vaccines.

Liposome-encapsulated mRNA encoding a viral antigen was shown in 1993 to stimulate T cells in mice. The following year self-amplifying mRNA was developed by including both a viral antigen and replicase encoding gene. The method was used in mice to elicit both a humoral and cellular immune response against a viral pathogen. The next year mRNA encoding a tumor antigen was shown to elicit a similar immune response against cancer cells in mice.

=== Development ===
The first human clinical trial using ex vivo dendritic cells transfected with mRNA encoding tumor antigens (therapeutic cancer mRNA vaccine) was started in 2001. Four years later, the successful use of modified nucleosides as a method to transport mRNA inside cells without setting off the body's defense system was reported. Clinical trial results of an mRNA vaccine directly injected into the body against cancer cells were reported in 2008.

BioNTech in 2008, and Moderna in 2010, were founded to develop mRNA biotechnologies. The US research agency DARPA launched at this time the biotechnology research program ADEPT to develop emerging technologies for the US military. The agency recognized the potential of nucleic acid technology for defense against pandemics and began to invest in the field. DARPA grants were seen as a vote of confidence that in turn encouraged other government agencies and private investors to invest in mRNA technology. DARPA awarded at the time a $25 million grant to Moderna.

The first human clinical trials using an mRNA vaccine against an infectious agent (rabies) began in 2013. Over the next few years, clinical trials of mRNA vaccines for a number of other viruses were started. mRNA vaccines for human use were studied for infectious agents such as influenza, Zika virus, cytomegalovirus, and Chikungunya virus.

=== Authorizations of COVID-19 vaccines ===
The COVID-19 pandemic, and sequencing of the causative virus SARS-CoV-2 at the beginning of 2020, led to the rapid development of the first approved mRNA vaccines. BioNTech and Moderna in December of the same year obtained approval for their mRNA-based COVID-19 vaccines. In December 2020, the UK Medicines and Healthcare products Regulatory Agency (MHRA) became the first global medicines regulator in history to approve an mRNA vaccine, granting emergency authorization for Pfizer–BioNTech's BNT162b2 COVID-19 vaccine for widespread use. Also, in December 2020, the US Food and Drug Administration gave emergency use authorization for the Pfizer–BioNTech COVID-19 vaccine and the Moderna COVID-19 vaccine.

=== Other vaccines ===
In May 2024, Moderna's mResvia, an mRNA respiratory syncytial virus vaccine, was authorized for medical use in the United States. The company's mCombriax, a combined messenger RNA vaccine for protection against influenza and COVID‑19 was authorized for marketing in the European Union in February 2026. Their influenza vaccine, mFlusiva (mRNA-1010), was approved for medical use in the United States in August 2026 for people over the age of 50.

== Mechanism ==
An illustration of the mechanism of action of a messenger RNA vaccine

The goal of a vaccine is to stimulate the adaptive immune system to create antibodies that precisely target that particular pathogen. The markers on the pathogen that the antibodies target are called antigens.

Traditional vaccines stimulate an antibody response by injecting either antigens, an attenuated (weakened) virus, an inactivated (dead) virus, or a recombinant antigen-encoding viral vector (harmless carrier virus with an antigen transgene) into the body. These antigens and viruses are prepared and grown outside the body.

In contrast, mRNA vaccines introduce a short-lived synthetically created fragment of the RNA sequence of a virus into the individual being vaccinated. These mRNA fragments are taken up by dendritic cells through phagocytosis. The dendritic cells use their internal machinery (ribosomes) to read the mRNA and produce the viral antigens that the mRNA encodes. The body degrades the mRNA fragments within a few days of introduction. Although non-immune cells can potentially also absorb vaccine mRNA, produce antigens, and display the antigens on their surfaces, dendritic cells absorb the mRNA globules much more readily. The mRNA fragments are translated in the cytoplasm and do not affect the body's genomic DNA, located separately in the cell nucleus.

Once the viral antigens are produced by the host cell, the normal adaptive immune system processes are followed. Antigens are broken down by proteasomes. Class I and class II MHC molecules then attach to the antigen and transport it to the cellular membrane, "activating" the dendritic cell. Once activated, dendritic cells migrate to lymph nodes, where they present the antigen to T cells and B cells. This triggers the production of antibodies specifically targeted to the antigen, ultimately resulting in immunity.

== mRNA ==
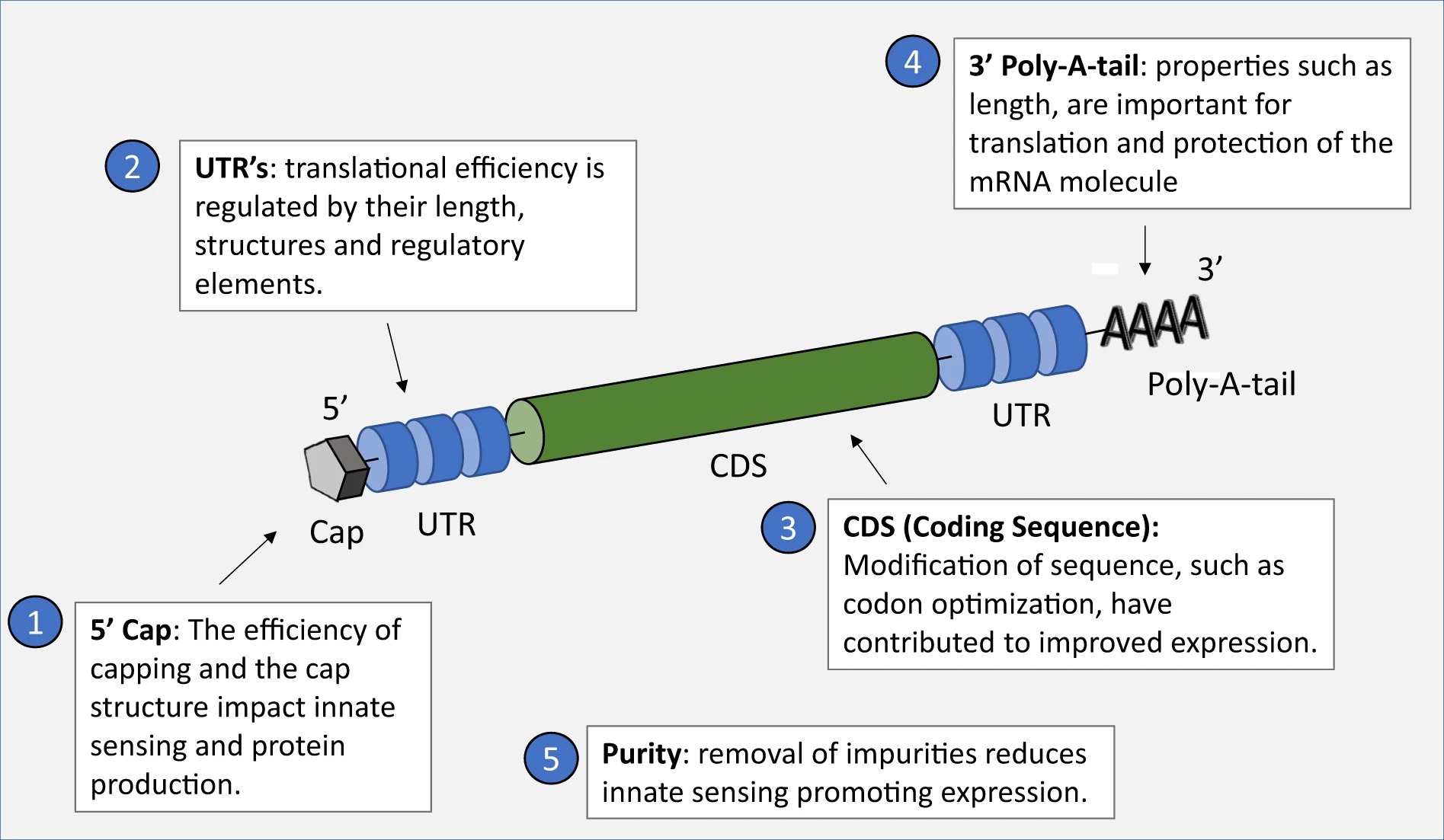
mRNA components important for expressing the antigen sequence

The central component of a mRNA vaccine is its mRNA construct. The in vitro transcribed mRNA is generated from an engineered plasmid DNA, which has an RNA polymerase promoter and sequence which corresponds to the mRNA construct. By combining T7 phage RNA polymerase and the plasmid DNA, the mRNA can be transcribed in the lab. Efficacy of the vaccine is dependent on the stability and structure of the designed mRNA.

The in vitro transcribed mRNA has the same structural components as natural mRNA in eukaryotic cells. It has a 5' cap, a 5'-untranslated region (UTR) and 3'-UTR, an open reading frame (ORF), which encodes the relevant antigen, and a 3'-poly(A) tail. By modifying these different components of the synthetic mRNA, the stability and translational ability of the mRNA can be enhanced, and in turn, the efficacy of the vaccine improved.

The mRNA can be improved by using synthetic 5'-cap analogues which enhance the stability and increase protein translation. Similarly, regulatory elements in the 5'-untranslated region and the 3'-untranslated region can be altered, and the length of the poly(A) tail optimized, to stabilize the mRNA and increase protein production. The mRNA nucleotides can be modified to both decrease innate immune activation and increase the mRNA's half-life in the host cell. The nucleic acid sequence and codon usage impacts protein translation. Enriching the sequence with guanine-cytosine content improves mRNA stability and half-life and, in turn, protein production. Replacing rare codons with synonymous codons frequently used by the host cell also enhances protein production.

== Delivery ==
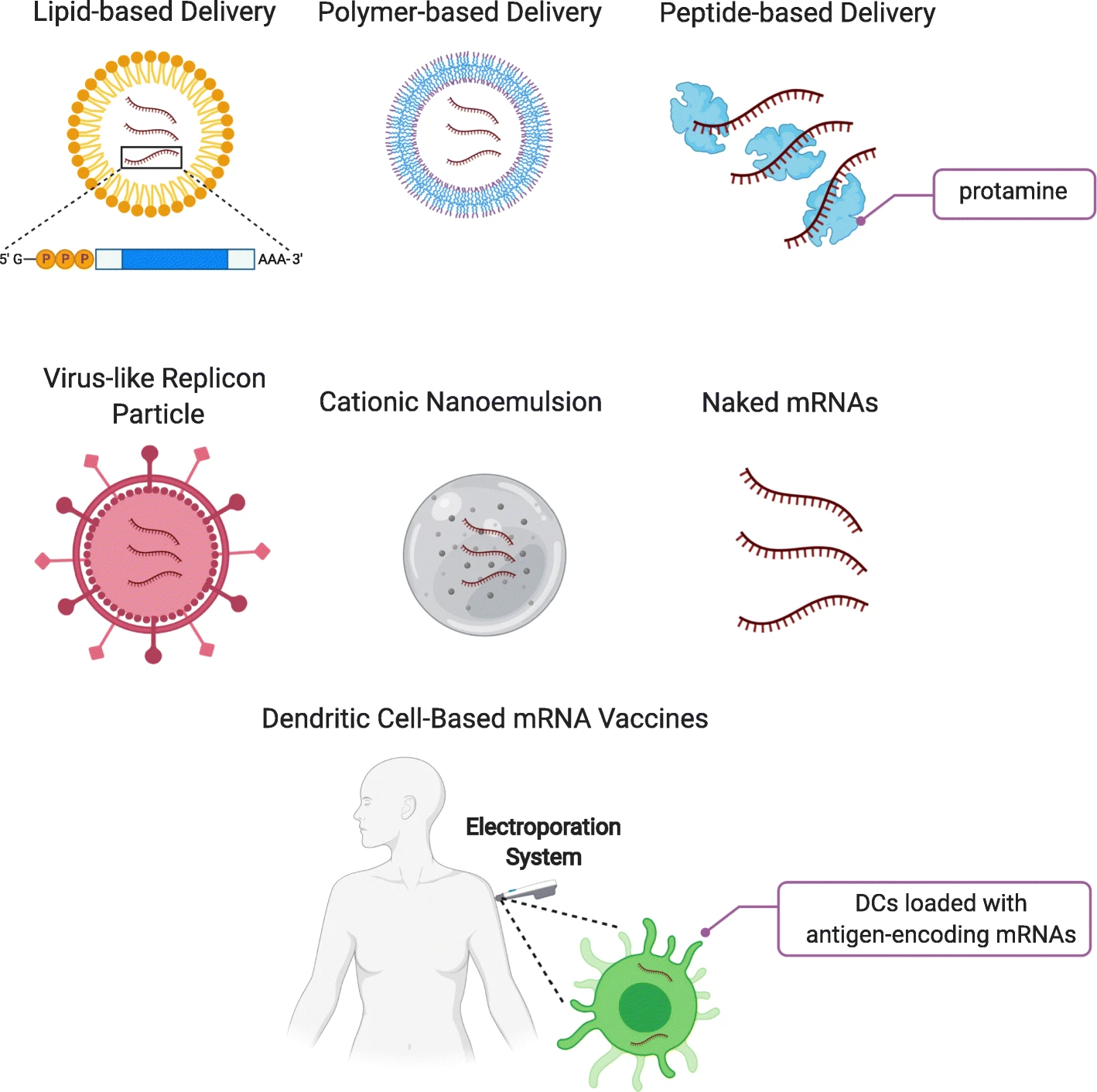
Major delivery methods and carrier molecules for mRNA vaccines

For a vaccine to be successful, sufficient mRNA must enter the host cell cytoplasm to stimulate production of the specific antigens. Entry of mRNA molecules, however, faces a number of difficulties. Not only are mRNA molecules too large to cross the cell membrane by simple diffusion, they are also negatively charged like the cell membrane, which causes a mutual electrostatic repulsion. Additionally, mRNA is easily degraded by RNAases in skin and blood.

Various methods have been developed to overcome these delivery hurdles. The method of vaccine delivery can be broadly classified by whether mRNA transfer into cells occurs within (in vivo) or outside (ex vivo) the organism.

=== Ex vivo ===
Dendritic cells display antigens on their surfaces, leading to interactions with T cells to initiate an immune response. Dendritic cells can be collected from patients and programmed with the desired mRNA, then administered back into patients to create an immune response.

The simplest way that ex vivo dendritic cells take up mRNA molecules is through endocytosis, a fairly inefficient pathway in the laboratory setting that can be significantly improved through electroporation.

=== In vivo ===
Since the discovery that the direct administration of in vitro transcribed mRNA leads to the expression of antigens in the body, in vivo approaches have been investigated. They offer some advantages over ex vivo methods, particularly by avoiding the cost of harvesting and adapting dendritic cells from patients and by imitating a regular infection.

Different routes of injection, such as into the skin, blood, or muscles, result in varying levels of mRNA uptake, making the choice of administration route a critical aspect of in vivo delivery. One study showed, in comparing different routes, that lymph node injection leads to the largest T-cell response.

==== Naked mRNA injection ====
Naked mRNA injection means that the delivery of the vaccine is only done in a buffer solution. This mode of mRNA uptake has been known since the 1990s. The first worldwide clinical studies used intradermal injections of naked mRNA for vaccination. A variety of methods have been used to deliver naked mRNA, such as subcutaneous, intravenous, and intratumoral injections. Although naked mRNA delivery causes an immune response, the effect is relatively weak, and after injection the mRNA is often rapidly degraded.

==== Polymer and peptide vectors ====
Cationic polymers can be mixed with mRNA to generate protective coatings called polyplexes. These protect the recombinant mRNA from ribonucleases and assist its penetration in cells. Protamine is a natural cationic peptide and has been used to encapsulate mRNA for vaccination.

==== Lipid nanoparticle vector ====
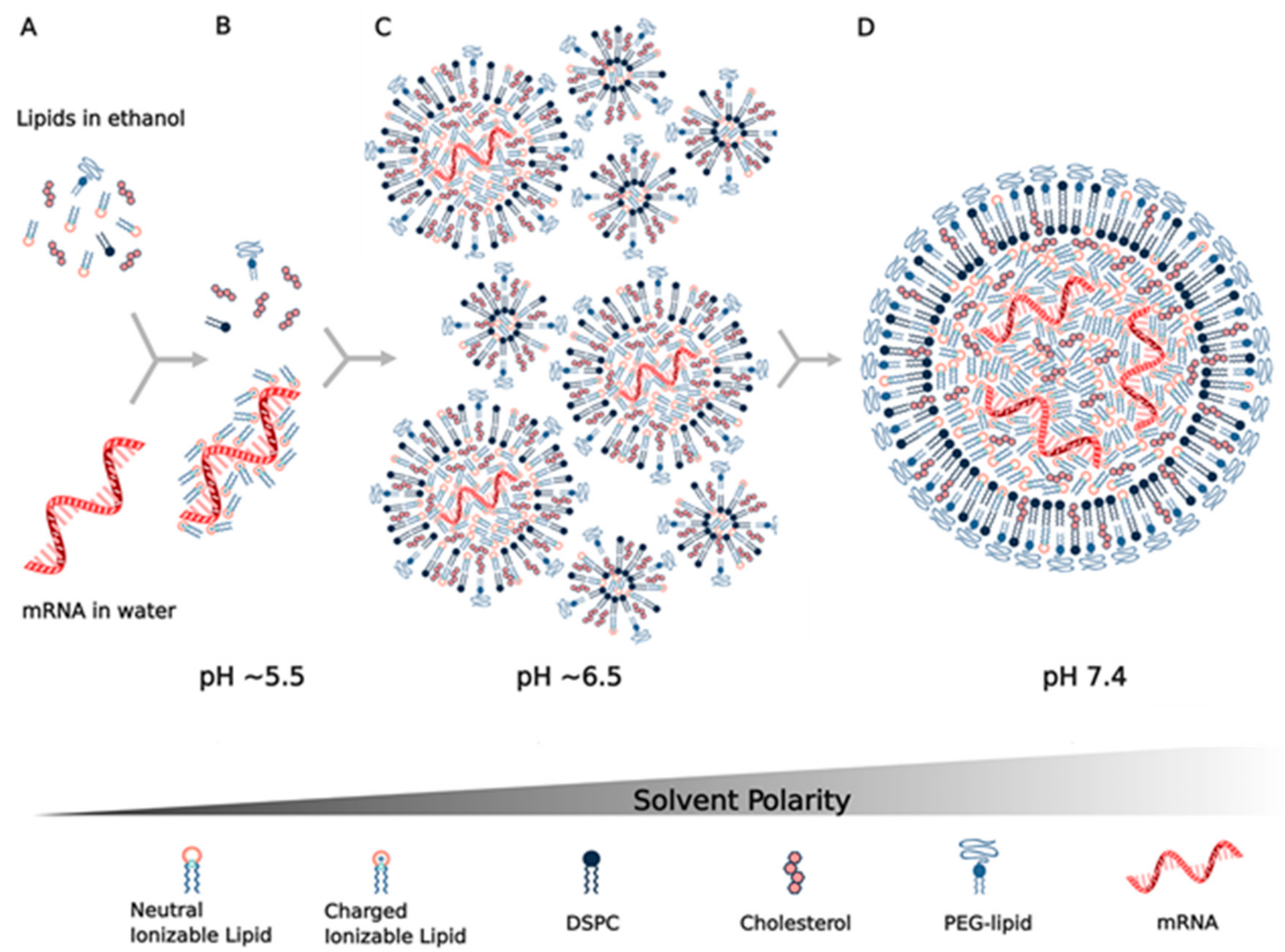
Assembly of RNA lipid nanoparticle

The first time the FDA approved the use of lipid nanoparticles as a drug delivery system was in 2018, when the agency approved the first siRNA drug, Onpattro. Encapsulating the mRNA molecule in lipid nanoparticles was a critical breakthrough for producing viable mRNA vaccines, solving a number of key technical barriers in delivering the mRNA molecule into the host cell. Research into using lipids to deliver siRNA to cells became a foundation for similar research into using lipids to deliver mRNA. However, new lipids had to be invented to encapsulate mRNA strands, which are much longer than siRNA strands.

Principally, the lipid provides a layer of protection against degradation, allowing more robust translational output. In addition, the customization of the lipid's outer layer allows the targeting of desired cell types through ligand interactions. However, many studies have also highlighted the difficulty of studying this type of delivery, demonstrating that there is an inconsistency between in vivo and in vitro applications of nanoparticles in terms of cellular intake. The nanoparticles can be administered to the body and transported via multiple routes, such as intravenously or through the lymphatic system.

One issue with lipid nanoparticles is that several of the breakthroughs leading to the practical use of that technology involve the use of microfluidics. Microfluidic reaction chambers are difficult to scale up, since the entire point of microfluidics is to exploit the microscale behaviors of liquids. The only way around this obstacle is to run an extensive number of microfluidic reaction chambers in parallel, a novel task requiring custom-built equipment. For COVID-19 mRNA vaccines, this was the main manufacturing bottleneck. Pfizer used such a parallel approach to solve the scaling problem. After verifying that impingement jet mixers could not be directly scaled up, Pfizer made about 100 of the little mixers (each about the size of a U.S. half-dollar coin), connected them together with pumps and filters with a "maze of piping," and set up a computer system to regulate flow and pressure through the mixers.

Another issue, with the large-scale use of this delivery method, is the availability of the novel lipids used to create lipid nanoparticles, especially ionizable cationic lipids. Before 2020, such lipids were manufactured in small quantities measured in grams or kilograms, and they were used for medical research and a handful of drugs for rare conditions. As the safety and efficacy of mRNA vaccines became clear in 2020, the few companies able to manufacture the requisite lipids were confronted with the challenge of scaling up production to respond to orders for several tons of lipids.

==== Viral vector ====
In addition to non-viral delivery methods, RNA viruses have been engineered to achieve similar immunological responses. Typical RNA viruses used as vectors include retroviruses, lentiviruses, alphaviruses and rhabdoviruses, each of which can differ in structure and function. Clinical studies have utilized such viruses on a range of diseases in model animals such as mice, chicken and primates.

== Advantages ==
=== Traditional vaccines ===
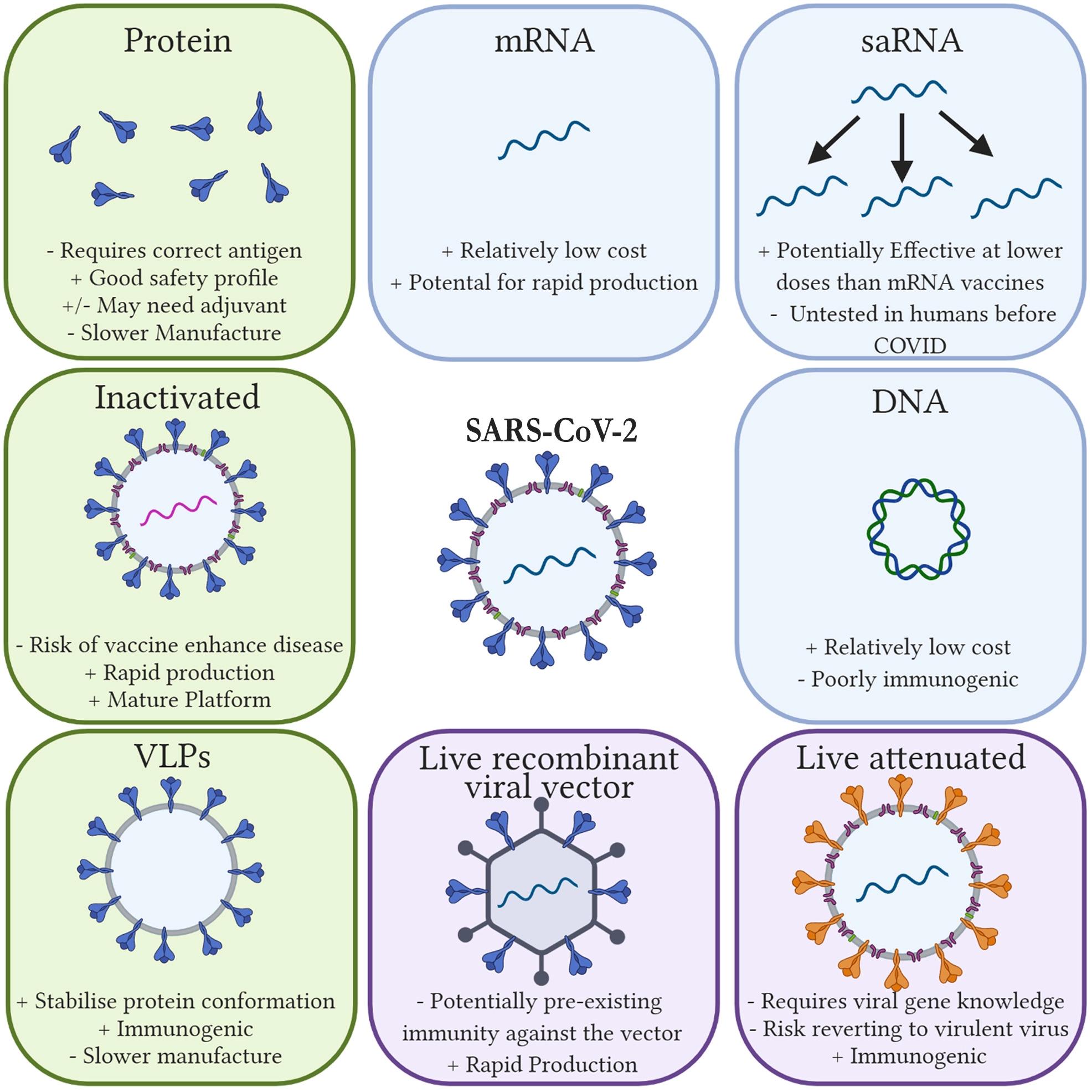
Advantages and disadvantages of different types of vaccine platforms

mRNA vaccines offer specific advantages over traditional vaccines. Because mRNA vaccines are not constructed from an active pathogen (or even an inactivated pathogen), they are non-infectious. In contrast, traditional vaccines require the production of pathogens, which, if done at high volumes, could increase the risks of localized outbreaks of the virus at the production facility. Another biological advantage of mRNA vaccines is that since the antigens are produced inside the cell, they stimulate cellular immunity, as well as humoral immunity.

mRNA vaccines have the production advantage that they can be designed swiftly. Moderna designed their mRNA-1273 vaccine for COVID-19 in 2 days. They can also be manufactured faster, more cheaply, and in a more standardized fashion (with fewer error rates in production), which can improve responsiveness to serious outbreaks.

The Pfizer–BioNTech vaccine originally required 110 days to mass-produce (before Pfizer began to optimize the manufacturing process to only 60 days), which was substantially faster than traditional flu and polio vaccines. Within that larger timeframe, the actual production time is only about 22 days: two weeks for molecular cloning of DNA plasmids and purification of DNA, four days for DNA-to-RNA transcription and purification of mRNA, and four days to encapsulate mRNA in lipid nanoparticles followed by fill and finish. The majority of the days needed for each production run are allocated to rigorous quality control at each stage.

=== DNA vaccines ===
In addition to sharing the advantages of theoretical DNA vaccines over established traditional vaccines, mRNA vaccines also have additional advantages over DNA vaccines. The mRNA is translated in the cytosol, so there is no need for the RNA to enter the cell nucleus, and the risk of being integrated into the host genome is averted. Modified nucleosides (for example, pseudouridines, 2'-O-methylated nucleosides) can be incorporated to mRNA to suppress immune response stimulation to avoid immediate degradation and produce a more persistent effect through enhanced translation capacity. The open reading frame (ORF) and untranslated regions (UTR) of mRNA can be optimized for different purposes (a process called sequence engineering of mRNA), for example through enriching the guanine-cytosine content or choosing specific UTRs known to increase translation. An additional ORF coding for a replication mechanism can be added to amplify antigen translation and therefore immune response, decreasing the amount of starting material needed.

== Disadvantages ==
=== Storage ===
Because mRNA is fragile, some vaccines must be kept at very low temperatures to avoid degrading and thus giving little effective immunity to the recipient. Pfizer–BioNTech's BNT162b2 mRNA vaccine has to be kept between −80 and −60 °C (−112 and −76 °F). Moderna says their mRNA-1273 vaccine can be stored between −25 and −15 °C (−13 and 5 °F), which is comparable to a home freezer, and that it remains stable between 2 and 8 °C (36 and 46 °F) for up to 30 days. In November 2020, it was reported, "While it's possible that differences in LNP formulations or mRNA secondary structures could account for the thermostability differences [between Moderna and BioNtech], many experts suspect both vaccine products will ultimately prove to have similar storage requirements and shelf lives under various temperature conditions." Several platforms are being studied that may allow storage at higher temperatures.

=== Recent ===
Before 2020, no mRNA technology platform (drug or vaccine) had been approved for therapeutic use in humans, so there was a risk of unknown effects. The 2020 COVID-19 pandemic required faster production capability of mRNA vaccines, which made them attractive to national health organisations, and led to debate about the type of initial authorization mRNA vaccines should get (including emergency use authorization or expanded access authorization) after the eight-week period of post-final human trials.

=== Side effects ===
Reactogenicity is similar to that of conventional, non-RNA vaccines. However, those susceptible to an autoimmune response may have an adverse reaction to mRNA vaccines. The mRNA strands in the vaccine may elicit an unintended immune reaction – this entails the body believing itself to be sick, and the person feeling as if they are as a result. To minimize this, mRNA sequences in mRNA vaccines are designed to mimic those produced by host cells.

Strong but transient reactogenic effects were reported in trials of novel COVID-19 mRNA vaccines; most people will not experience severe side effects which include fever and fatigue. Severe side effects are defined as those that prevent daily activity.

== Efficacy ==
The COVID-19 mRNA vaccines from Moderna and Pfizer–BioNTech had short-term efficacy rates of over 90 percent against the original SARS-CoV-2 virus. Prior to mRNA, drug trials on pathogens other than COVID-19 were not effective and had to be abandoned in the early phases of trials. The reason for the efficacy of the new mRNA vaccines is not clear.

Physician-scientist Margaret Liu stated that the efficacy of the new COVID-19 mRNA vaccines could be due to the "sheer volume of resources" that went into development, or that the vaccines might be "triggering a nonspecific inflammatory response to the mRNA that could be heightening its specific immune response, given that the modified nucleoside technique reduced inflammation but hasn't eliminated it completely", and that "this may also explain the intense reactions such as aches and fevers reported in some recipients of the mRNA SARS-CoV-2 vaccines". These reactions though severe were transient and another view is that they were believed to be a reaction to the lipid drug delivery molecules. In June 2021, the US Food and Drug Administration added a warning about the possibility of increased risk of myocarditis and pericarditis for some people.

== Hesitancy ==
There is misinformation implying that mRNA vaccines could alter DNA in the nucleus. mRNA in the cytosol is rapidly degraded, before it would have time to gain entry into the cell nucleus. Retrovirus can be single-stranded RNA (just as many SARS-CoV-2 vaccines are single-stranded RNA) which enters the cell nucleus and uses reverse transcriptase to make DNA from the RNA in the cell nucleus. A retrovirus has mechanisms to be imported into the nucleus, but other mRNA (such as the vaccine) lack these mechanisms. Once inside the nucleus, creation of DNA from RNA cannot occur without a reverse transcriptase and appropriate primers, which both accompany a retrovirus, but which would not be present for other exogenous mRNA (such as a vaccine) even if it could enter the nucleus.

== Amplification ==
mRNA vaccines use either non-amplifying (conventional) mRNA or self-amplifying mRNA. Pfizer–BioNTech and Moderna vaccines use non-amplifying mRNA. Both mRNA types continue to be investigated as vaccine methods against other potential pathogens and cancer.

=== Non-amplifying ===
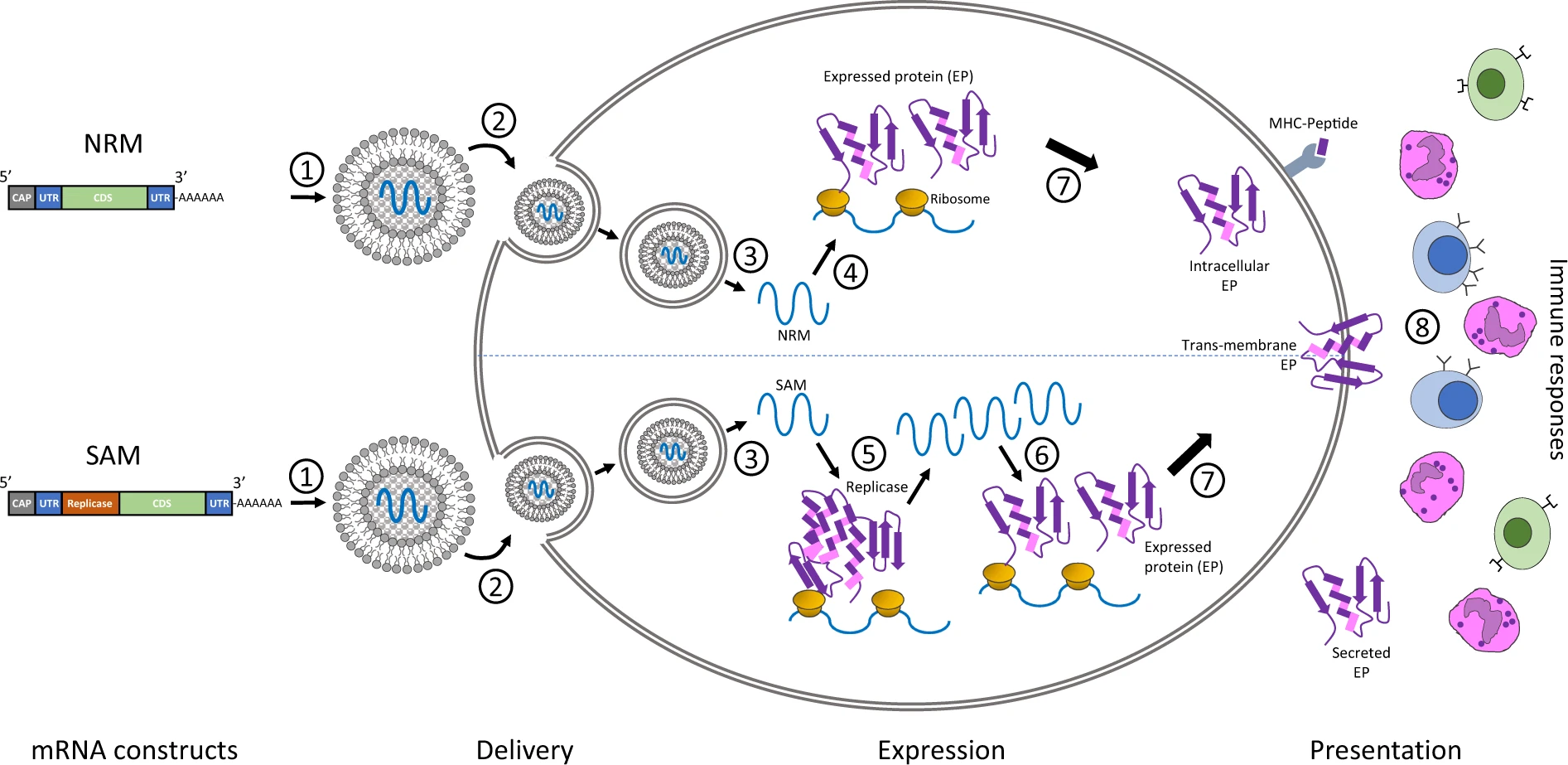
Mechanism of non-amplifying and self-amplifying mRNA vaccines

The initial mRNA vaccines use a non-amplifying mRNA construct. Non-amplifying mRNA has only one open reading frame that codes for the antigen of interest. The total amount of mRNA available to the cell is equal to the amount delivered by the vaccine. Dosage strength is limited by the amount of mRNA that can be delivered by the vaccine. Non-amplifying vaccines replace uridine with N1-Methylpseudouridine in an attempt to reduce toxicity.

=== Self-amplifying ===
Self-amplifying mRNA (saRNA) vaccines replicate their mRNA after transfection. Self-amplifying mRNA has two open reading frames. The first frame, like conventional mRNA, codes for the antigen of interest. The second frame codes for an RNA-dependent RNA polymerase (and its helper proteins) which replicates the mRNA construct in the cell. This allows smaller vaccine doses. The mechanisms and consequently the evaluation of self-amplifying mRNA may be different, as self-amplifying mRNA is a much bigger molecule.

SaRNA vaccines being researched include a malaria vaccine. The first saRNA Covid vaccine authorised was Gemcovac, in India in June 2022. The second was ARCT-154, developed by Arcturus Therapeutics. A version manufactured by Meiji Seika Pharma was authorised in Japan in November 2023.

GSK began a phase 1 trial of an saRNA COVID-19 vaccine in 2021. Gritstone bio started also started a phase 1 trial of an saRNA COVID-19 vaccine in 2021, used as a booster vaccine, with interim results published in 2023. The vaccine is designed to target both the spike protein of the SARS‑CoV‑2 virus, and viral proteins that may be less prone to genetic variation, to provide greater protection against SARS‑CoV‑2 variants. saRNA vaccines must use uridine, which is required for reproduction to occur.
