= Timeline of human vaccines =

This is a timeline of the development of prophylactic human vaccines. Early vaccines may be listed by the first year of development or testing, but later entries usually show the year the vaccine finished trials and became available on the market. Although vaccines exist for the diseases listed below, only smallpox has been eliminated worldwide. The other vaccine-preventable illnesses continue to cause millions of deaths each year.

== 18th century ==
- 1796 – Edward Jenner develops and documents first vaccine for smallpox.

== 19th century ==
- 1881 - First vaccine for anthrax by Louis Pasteur
- 1884-1885 – First vaccine for cholera by Jaime Ferran y Clua
- 1885 – First vaccine for rabies by Louis Pasteur and Émile Roux
- 1890 – First vaccine for tetanus (serum antitoxin) by Emil von Behring
- 1896 – First vaccine for typhoid fever by Almroth Edward Wright, Richard Pfeiffer, and Wilhelm Kolle
- 1897 – First vaccine for bubonic plague by Waldemar Haffkine

== 20th century ==
- 1921 – First vaccine for tuberculosis by Albert Calmette
- 1923 – First vaccine for diphtheria by Gaston Ramon, Emil von Behring and Kitasato Shibasaburō
- 1924 – First vaccine for scarlet fever by George F. Dick and Gladys Dick
- 1924 – First inactive vaccine for tetanus (tetanus toxoid, TT) by Gaston Ramon, Christian Zoeller and Pierre Descombey
- 1926 – First vaccine for pertussis (whooping cough) by Leila Denmark
- 1932 – First vaccine for yellow fever by Max Theiler and Jean Laigret
- 1937 – First vaccine for typhus by Rudolf Weigl, Ludwik Fleck and Hans Zinsser
- 1937 – First vaccine for influenza by Anatolii Smorodintsev.
- 1941 – First vaccine for tick-borne encephalitis
- 1952 – First vaccine for polio by Jonas Salk
- 1954 – First vaccine for Japanese encephalitis
- 1957 – First vaccine for adenovirus-4 and 7
- 1962 – First oral vaccine for polio by Albert Sabin
- 1963 – First vaccine for measles by John Franklin Enders
- 1967 – First vaccine for mumps
- 1970 – First vaccine for rubella
- 1977 – First vaccine for pneumonia (Streptococcus pneumoniae)
- 1978 – First vaccine for meningitis (Neisseria meningitidis)
- 1980 – Smallpox declared eradicated worldwide due to vaccination efforts
- 1981 – First vaccine for hepatitis B (first vaccine to target a cause of cancer)
- 1984 – First vaccine for chicken pox
- 1985 – First vaccine for Haemophilus influenzae type b (HiB)
- 1989 – First vaccine for Q fever
- 1990 – First vaccine for hantavirus hemorrhagic fever with renal syndrome
- 1991 – First vaccine for hepatitis A
- 1998 – First vaccine for Lyme disease
- 1998 – First vaccine for rotavirus

== 21st century ==
- 2000 – First pneumococcal conjugate vaccine approved in the U.S. (PCV7 or Prevnar)
- 2003 – First nasal influenza vaccine approved in U.S. (FluMist)
- 2003 – First vaccine for Argentine hemorrhagic fever.
- 2006 – First vaccine for human papillomavirus (which is a cause of cervical cancer)
- 2006 – First herpes zoster vaccine for shingles
- 2011 – First vaccine for non-small-cell lung carcinoma (comprises 85% of lung cancer cases)
- 2012 – First vaccine for hepatitis E
- 2012 – First quadrivalent (4-strain) influenza vaccine
- 2013 – First vaccine for enterovirus 71, one cause of hand, foot, and mouth disease
- 2015 – First vaccine for malaria
- 2015 – First vaccine for dengue fever
- 2019 – First vaccine for Ebola approved
- 2020 – First vaccine for COVID-19
- 2023 – First respiratory syncytial virus vaccine
- 2023 – First vaccine for Chikungunya
