= Halidou Tinto =

Professor of parasitology and global health scientist

Halidou Tinto is a professor of parasitology and global health scientist with research that has contributed to understanding and combating malaria in Sub-Saharan Africa. Tinto founded the Clinical Research Unit of Nanaro (CRUN) in Burkina Faso as part of the Institut de Recherche en Sciences de la Santé (IRSS). Tinto is now the Regional Director of the IRSS, and throughout his career he has contributed to the study of antimalarial drug resistance and the development of malaria vaccines.

Tinto grew up in Abidjan, Ivory Coast, but continued his professional studies across various countries. Tinto attended the University of Mali to study pharmacy, before obtaining a master's degree in microbiology and biochemistry from the University of Ouagadougou in Burkina Faso. Briefly leaving the continent of Africa, Halidou Tinto went on to pursue his PhD at the Institute of Tropical Medicine Antwerp.

== Early years and education ==
Halidou Tinto grew up in Abidjan, Ivory Coast. As a teenager in the 1980s, his initial career aspiration was to become a famous musician, with him even recording a few singles. His eye turned from music to more formal schooling due to encouragement from his father. Tinto commenced his higher education with pharmaceutical studies at the University of Mali School of Medicine and Pharmacy. During his studies, he took on an internship from 1995 to 1999 at Centre Muraz in Burkina Faso. Much of his later research was inspired from his work in Tinga Robert Guiguemdé's lab at Centre Muraz. As a research associate, he studied the epidemiology of antimalarial drug resistance.

In 1998, Halidou Tinto furthered his studies by obtaining a master's degree in applied microbiology and Biochemistry from the University of Ouagadougou in Burkina Faso. Following his postgraduate studies, Tinto moved to Denmark for a year, where he worked on the development of new malaria combating drugs, at the Royal Danish School of Pharmacy. Upon return to Burkina Faso in 2001, he held his second research associate position, but this time at the Institute for Health Sciences Research (IRSS). Going back to Europe in 2003, Tinto completed his PhD studies in 2006 at the Institute of Tropical Medicine in Antwerp. His PhD focused on antimalarial drug resistance through the examination of mechanisms of malaria parasites.

== Career ==
=== Founding the Clinical Research Unit of Nanoro ===
After completing his PhD in Belgium, Halidou Tinto turned down an opportunity to work at the University of Ohio, and instead returned to the IRSS in Burkina Faso to establish his own research unit. By 2009, Tinto had created the Clinical Research Unit of Nanoro (CRUN) as part of the IRSS. This unit was a standout across the continent of Africa due to its advanced infrastructure that meets the international standards to run clinical trials. CRUN has developed into an equipped center that has the means to test new interventions in a GCP-compliant setting. Upon its founding, CRUN only staffed 10 people, but has now developed into a 600 person workforce. Their 27 projects span areas including malaria, bacterial infections, nutrition, and cardiometabolic diseases. Halidou Tinto oversaw the conduction of over 30 clinical trials at CRUN, including the GSK RTS,S phase 3 malaria vaccine trials.

=== R21 vaccine achievements ===
Following 2014 up until 2022, through the IRSS in Burkina Faso, Halidou Tinto worked with Oxford University on the development of an improved RTS,S malaria vaccine, called R21/Matrix-M. Tinto's research, funded by the European and Developing Countries Clinical Trials Partnership 2 (EDCTP2), Wellcome Trust, and NIHR Oxford Biomedical Research Centre, conducted a clinical trial that found the new R21 vaccine to have an improved efficacy of 77% when given with a higher adjuvant dose in the 12 months following the initial 3 dose regimen. This was an achievement in Tinto's career as he was the Principal Investigator in these phase 2 trials, which led to the R21 being the only malaria vaccine to meet WHO's 75% efficacy standard. His research, published in 2021, and gaining WHO approval in 2022, was the first achievement of its kind in the history of malaria vaccine development.

== Appointments and awards ==
=== Appointments ===
- 2014 - 2015: Scientific Director of Centre Muraz
- 2016 - Current: Director of Research in Parasitology
- 2016 - Current: Regional Director of Institut de Recherche en Sciences de la Santé (IRSS)

=== Awards ===
- Best Scientist of the Year 2021 - International Achievements Research Center

Tinto has also received several awards from the Europea Business Academy and its subsidiary, the "Academic Union, Oxford", which sell "fake awards", as below.

- The name in Science 2021 - Academic Union, Oxford
- Honorary Professor 2022 - Academic Union, Oxford
- European Quality Award 2022 - Europe Business Academy
