= Circumsporozoite protein =

Protein secreted by the malaria parasite

Schematic representation of the CSP

Circumsporozoite protein (CSP) is a secreted protein of the sporozoite stage of the malaria parasite (Plasmodium sp.) and is the antigenic target of RTS,S and other malaria vaccines. The amino-acid sequence of CSP consists of an immunodominant central repeat region flanked by conserved motifs at the N- and C- termini that are implicated in protein processing as the parasite travels from the mosquito to the mammalian vector. The amino acid sequence of CSP was determined in 1984.

The structure and function of CSP is highly conserved across the various strains of malaria that infect humans, non-human primates and rodents. It can first be detected in large quantities as sporozoites are forming within oocysts residing in the midgut walls of infected mosquitoes. Upon egression from mature oocysts, sporozoites begin migrating to the salivary glands, and CSP is known to be an important mediator of this process. Additionally, CSP is involved in hepatocyte binding in the mammalian host. Here, the N-terminus and central repeat region initially facilitate parasite binding. On the hepatocyte surface proteolytic cleavage at region 1 of the N-terminus exposes the adhesive domain of the C-terminus, thereby priming the parasites for invasion of the liver.

CSP is an approximately 58 kD protein, anchored to the parasite's cell surface via a GPI-anchor.
