= Cholera vaccine =

Vaccine to prevent cholera

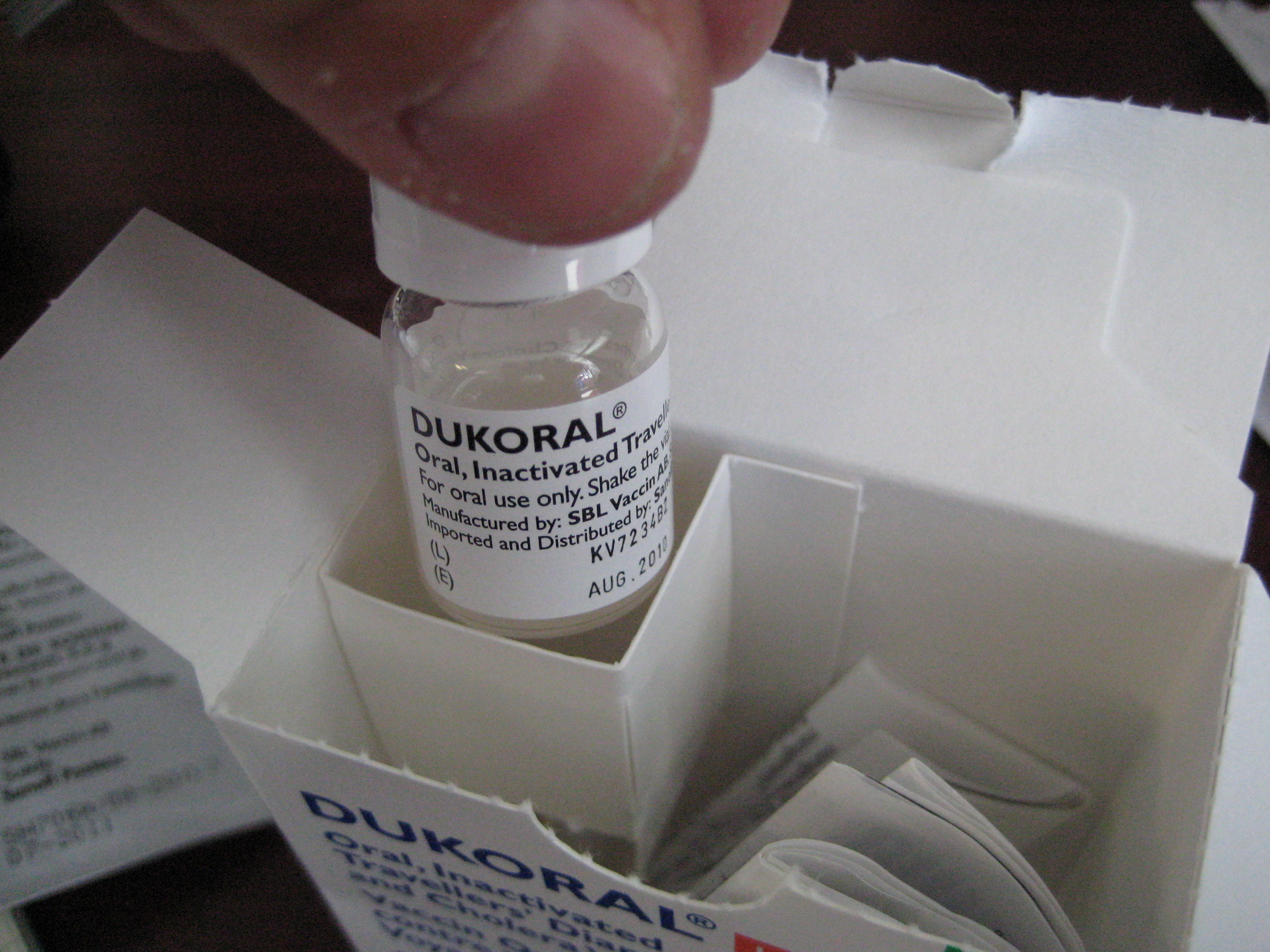

Vaccine description
- Target: Vibrio cholerae
- Vaccine type: Inactivated

Clinical data
- Trade names: Dukoral, Vaxchora, others
- AHFS/Drugs.com: Micromedex Detailed Consumer Information
- License data: US DailyMed: Cholera
- Pregnancy category: AU: B2
- Routes of administration: By mouth
- ATC code: J07AE01 (WHO) J07AE02 (WHO) J07AE51 (WHO)

Legal status
- Legal status: AU: S4 (Prescription only); CA: ℞-only / Schedule D; UK: POM (Prescription only); US: ℞-only; EU: Rx-only

Identifiers
- DrugBank: DB11643; DB14443
- ChemSpider: none
- UNII: V9G528E9E0
- KEGG: D03530

A cholera vaccine is a vaccine that is effective at reducing the risk of contracting cholera. The recommended cholera vaccines are administered orally to elicit local immune responses in the gut, where the intestinal cells produce antibodies against Vibrio cholerae, the bacteria responsible for the illness. This immune response was poorly achieved with the injectable vaccines that were used until the 1970s. The first effective oral cholera vaccine was Dukoral, developed in Sweden in the 1980s. For the first six months after vaccination it provides about 85% protection, which decreases to approximately 60% during the first two years. When enough of the population is immunized, it may protect those who have not been immunized thereby increasing the total protective impact to more than 90% (known as herd immunity).

The World Health Organization (WHO) recommends the use of three oral cholera vaccines – Dukoral, Shanchol, and Euvichol-Plus – in combination with other measures among those at high risk for cholera. Two vaccine doses with a one to six week interval are typically recommended. The duration of protection is at least two years in adults and six months in children aged one to five years. A live, attenuated single-dose oral vaccine is available for those traveling to an area where cholera is common but is not WHO approved for public health use.

The available types of oral cholera vaccine are generally considered safe for most of the population. These vaccines were shown to be safe in pregnancy and in those with poor immune function. The main side effects that could be experienced include mild abdominal pain or diarrhea.

The first cholera vaccines were developed in the late 19th century. They were the first widely used vaccines that were made in a laboratory but were largely abandoned in the 1970s due to their then-documented reactogenicity and poor efficacy.

Oral cholera vaccines were first introduced in the 1990s. It is on the World Health Organization's List of Essential Medicines.

These vaccines are licensed for use in more than 60 countries. In countries where the disease is common, the vaccine appears to be cost-effective.

== Medical use ==
In the late 20th century, oral cholera vaccines started to be used on a massive scale, with millions of vaccinations taking place, as a tool to control cholera outbreaks in addition to the traditional interventions of improving safe water supplies, sanitation, handwashing, and other means of improving hygiene. The Dukoral vaccine, which combines formalin- and heat-killed whole cells of Vibrio cholerae O1 and a recombinant cholera toxin B subunit, was licensed in 1991 and has been used widely, mainly for travellers. The Shanchol bivalent vaccine, which combines the O1 and O139 serogroups, was originally developed in Vietnam under the name mORCVAX in 1997 and given in 20 million doses in Vietnam's public health programme during the following decade through targeted mass vaccination of school-aged children in cholera endemic regions.

The World Health Organization (WHO) recommends both preventive and reactive use of the vaccine, making the following key statements:

WHO recommends that currently available cholera vaccines be used as complements to traditional control and preventive measures in areas where the disease is endemic and should be considered in areas at risk for outbreaks. Vaccination should not disrupt the provision of other high-priority health interventions to control or prevent cholera outbreaks... Reactive vaccination might be considered in view of limiting the extent of large prolonged outbreaks, provided the local infrastructure allows it, and an in-depth analysis of past cholera data and identification of a defined target area have been performed.

The observed vaccine-specific protection with two doses of the oral vaccine was 58–76%. Herd immunity can multiply the effectiveness of vaccination. Dukoral has been licensed for children two years of age and older, Shanchol and Euvichol-Plus for children one year of age and older. The administration of the vaccine to adults confers additional indirect protection (herd immunity) also to children.

As of 2013, the WHO established a revolving stockpile, initially of only two million oral cholera vaccine doses. With donations from mainly the GAVI Alliance the stockpile has progressively expanded to now more than 40 million doses per year. It consists mainly of the Euvichol-Plus oral cholera vaccine being produced in South Korea. In total more than 150 million doses from the stockpile have been given in mass campaigns against both epidemic and endemic cholera in more than 25 cholera-affected countries. A set goal of WHO's Global Task Force for Cholera Control (GTFCC) is, by using oral cholera vaccine and other available tools, by 2030 to have reduced cholera deaths by more than 90% and stopped transmission globally.

=== Oral ===
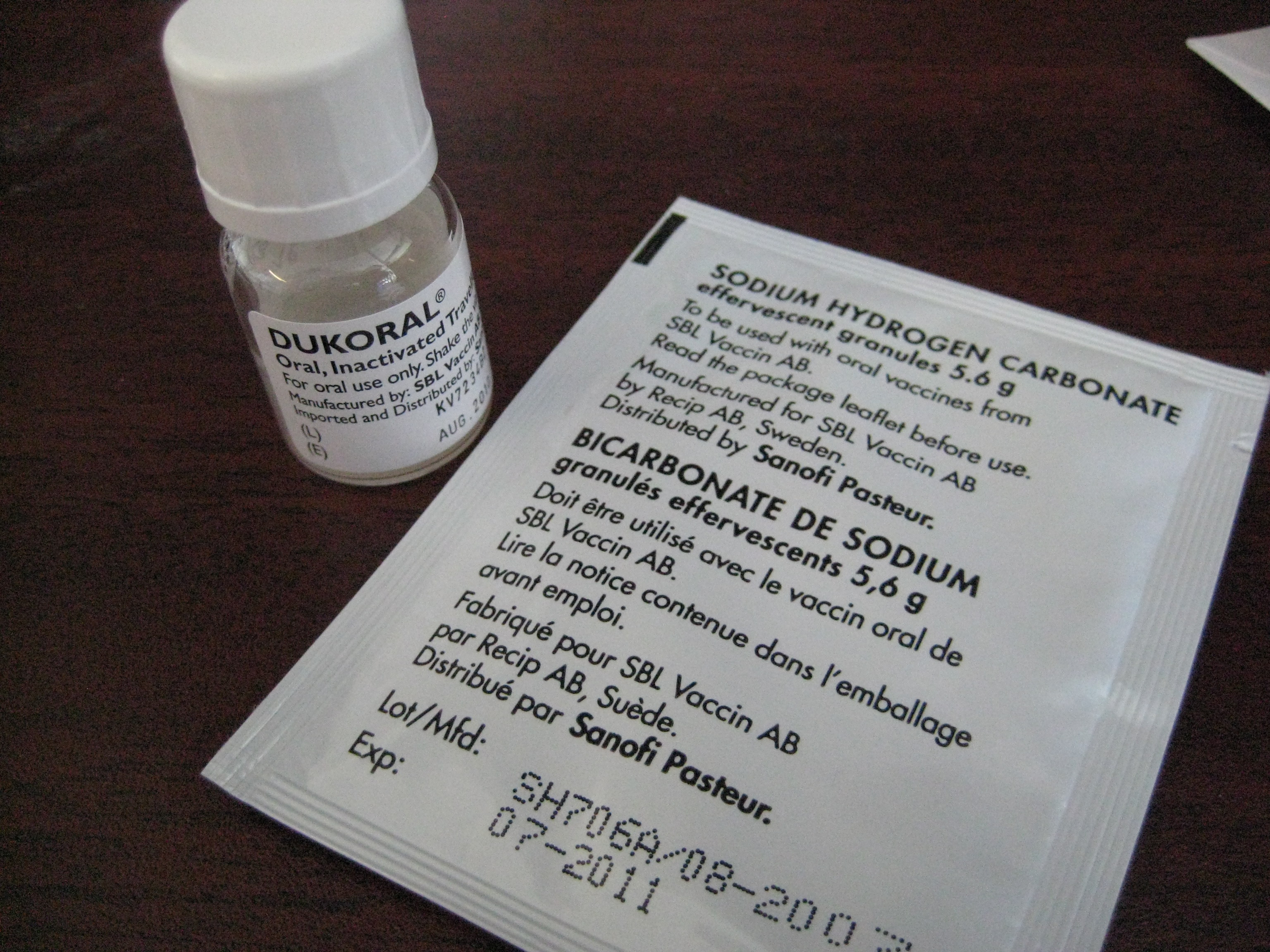
Dukoral: vial of inactivated vaccine with packet of sodium bicarbonate buffer

The oral vaccines are generally of two forms: inactivated and attenuated.

The first developed effective oral cholera vaccine, Dukoral, is a monovalent inactivated vaccine containing killed whole cells of V. cholerae O1 plus additional recombinant cholera toxin B subunit. Bacterial strains of both Inaba and Ogawa serotypes and of El Tor and Classical biotypes are included in the vaccine. Dukoral is taken orally with bicarbonate buffer, which protects the antigens from gastric acid. The vaccine acts by inducing antibodies against both the bacterial components and CTB. The antibacterial intestinal antibodies prevent the bacteria from attaching to the intestinal wall, thereby impeding colonisation of V. cholerae O1. The anti-toxin intestinal antibodies prevent the cholera toxin from binding to the intestinal mucosal surface, thereby preventing the toxin-mediated diarrhoeal symptoms.

The two later inactivated oral cholera vaccines recommended by WHO, Shanchol, and Euvichol-Plus, have an identical composition, containing killed whole cells of V. cholerae O1 (the same components as in Dukoral) plus formalin-killed V. cholerae O139 bacteria.

A live, attenuated oral vaccine (CVD 103-HgR or Vaxchora), derived from a serogroup O1 classical Inaba strain, was approved for use in travellers by the US FDA in 2016.

In 2024, the Euvichol-S vaccine, an optimized version of Euvichol-Plus, received WHO prequalification. This streamlined formulation is designed to maintain effectiveness while reducing production costs, significantly boosting the global oral cholera vaccine supply to 50 million doses, up from 38 million. This increase addresses the growing demand amid rising cholera outbreaks since 2021.

=== Injectable ===
Although rarely in use, the injected cholera vaccines can be effective for people living where cholera is common. While being ineffective in young children, in such areas they can offer some degree of protection in adults and older children for up to six months.

== Side effects ==
Both the inactivated and attenuated oral vaccines available are generally safe. Some of the common side effects include mild abdominal pain or diarrhea. They are safe in pregnancy and in those with poor immune function.

== History of development ==
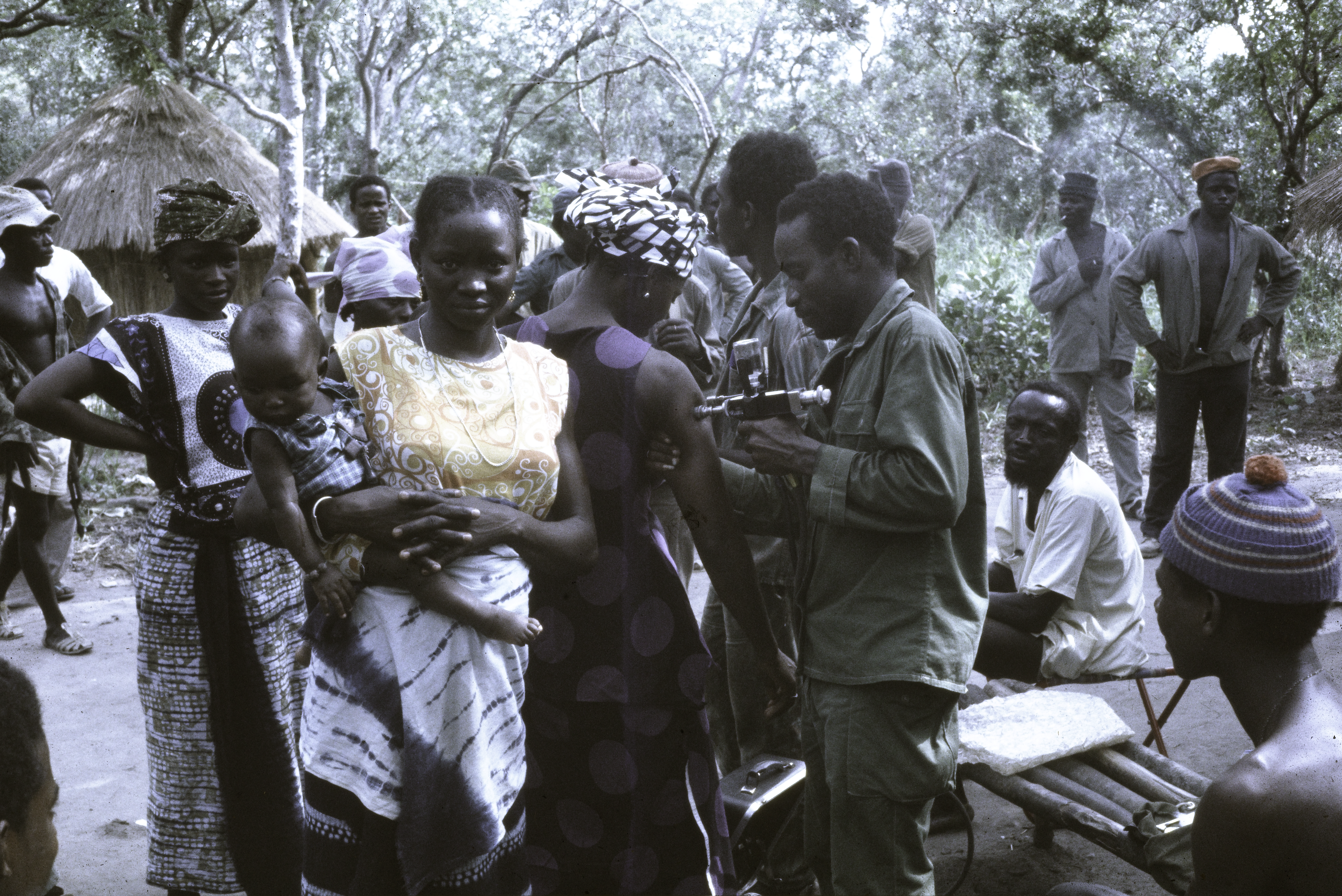
Cholera vaccinations by a Guinean nurse using a jet injector in Ziguinchor, Senegal, 1973

The first cholera vaccines were developed in the late 19th century. There were several pioneers in the development of the vaccine:

- The first known attempt at a cholera vaccine was made by Louis Pasteur and it was aimed at preventing cholera in chickens. This was the first widely used vaccine that was made in a laboratory. Later use showed this early cholera vaccine to be ineffective.
- In 1884, Spanish physician Jaume Ferran i Clua developed a live vaccine he had isolated from cholera patients in Marseilles, and used it on over 30,000 individuals in Valencia during that year's epidemic. However, his vaccine and inoculation was rather controversial and was rejected by his peers and several investigation commissions, but it ended up demonstrating its effectiveness and being recognized for it.
- In 1892, Waldemar Haffkine developed an effective vaccine with less severe side effects, later testing it on more than 40,000 people in the Calcutta area from 1893 to 1896. His vaccine was accepted by the medical community, and is credited as the first effective human cholera vaccine.
- Finally, in 1896, Wilhelm Kolle introduced a heat-killed vaccine that was significantly easier to prepare than Haffkine's, using it on a large scale in Japan in 1902.

Oral cholera vaccines were first introduced in the 1990s.

== Society and culture ==
=== Legal status ===
In 2016, the US Food and Drug Administration (FDA) approved Vaxchora, a single-dose oral vaccine to prevent cholera for travelers. As of June 2016, Vaxchora is the only FDA-approved vaccine for the prevention of cholera.

=== Economics ===
The cost to immunize against cholera is between US$0.10 and $4.00 per vaccination.

The Vaxchora vaccine can cost more than $250.
