= RTS,S =

Malaria vaccine

Vaccine description
- Target: P. falciparum; to a lesser extent Hepatitis B
- Vaccine type: Protein subunit

Clinical data
- Trade names: Mosquirix
- Routes of administration: intramuscular injection (0.5 mL)

Legal status
- Legal status: In general: ℞ (Prescription only)

Identifiers
- CAS Number: 149121-47-1
- UNII: 69SE2D63CL

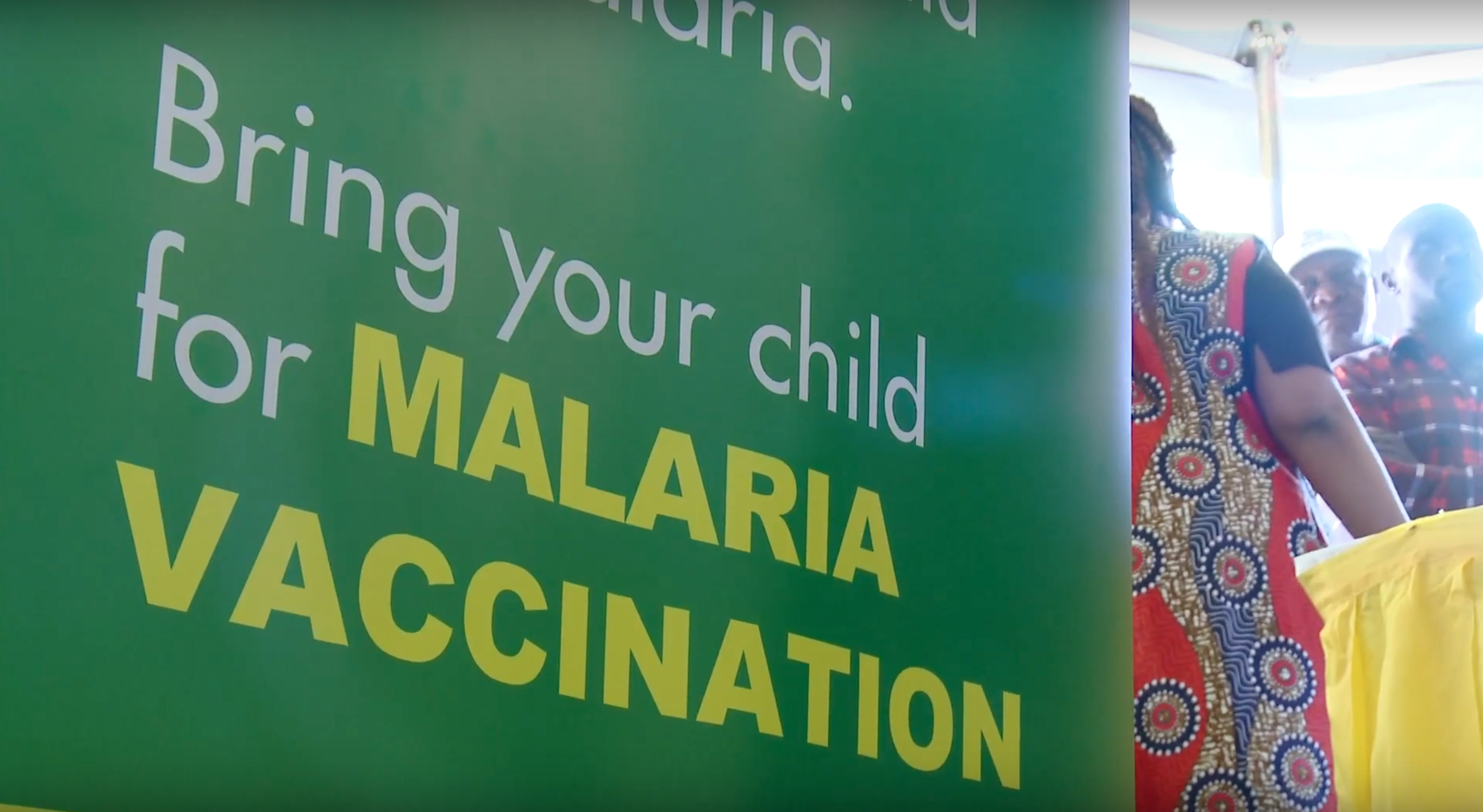
A poster advertising trials of the RTS,S vaccine

RTS,S/AS01 (trade name Mosquirix) is a recombinant protein-based malaria vaccine. It is one of two malaria vaccines approved (the other is R21/Matrix-M). As of April 2022, the vaccine has been given to 1 million children living in areas with moderate-to-high malaria transmission, with millions more doses to be provided as the vaccine's production expands. 18 million doses have been allocated for 2023–2025. It requires at least three doses in infants by age 2, with a fourth dose extending the protection for another 1–2 years. The vaccine reduces hospital admissions from severe malaria by around 30% and reduces toddler deaths by 15%.

== Medical uses ==
RTS,S/AS01 (commercial name Mosquirix) is one of two malaria vaccines approved and in current use (the other being R21). The vaccine's use requires at least three doses in infants by age 2, with a fourth dose extending the protection for another 1–2 years. The vaccine reduces hospital admissions from severe malaria by around 30%.

== History ==
Potential malaria vaccines have been an intense area of research since the 1960s. SPf66 was tested extensively in endemic areas in the 1990s, but clinical trials showed it to be insufficiently effective. Other vaccine candidates, targeting the blood-stage of the malaria parasite's life cycle, had also been insufficient on their own.

The RTS,S vaccine was conceived of and created in the late 1980s by scientists working at SmithKline Beecham Biologicals (now GlaxoSmithKline (GSK) Vaccines) laboratories in Belgium. The vaccine was further developed through a collaboration between GSK and the Walter Reed Army Institute of Research in the U.S. state of Maryland and has been funded in part by the non-profit PATH Malaria Vaccine Initiative (MVI) and the Bill and Melinda Gates Foundation.

RTS,S was engineered using genes from the outer protein of P. falciparum malaria parasite and a portion of a hepatitis B virus plus a chemical adjuvant to boost the immune response. Infection is prevented by inducing high antibody titers that block the parasite from infecting the liver.

The first human challenge study was conducted in 1997, with six out of seven volunteers developing protection against the parasite. A successful phase I trial took place in adult males in The Gambia in 1998. Subsequent phase I and II field trials were run in different regions with different dosages: first in 6–11-year-old children, then in 1–4 year olds, and finally in younger infants.

'The outcome was extremely promising', wrote Ripley Ballou in 2009, 'not only was the vaccine extremely well tolerated and highly immunogenic – it reduced the risk of infection by 65.9 percent (95 percent CI: 42.6– 79.8 percent, P < 0.0001) during a three-month follow-up period.'

In November 2012, a phase III trial of RTS,S found that it provided modest protection against both clinical and severe malaria in young infants. The RTS,S-based vaccine formulation had previously been demonstrated to be safe, well tolerated, immunogenic, and to potentially confer partial efficacy in both malaria-naive and malaria-experienced adults as well as children.

In October 2013, preliminary results of a phase III clinical trial indicated that RTS,S/AS01 reduced the number of cases among young children by almost 50 percent and among infants by around 25 percent. The study ended in 2014. The effects of a booster dose were positive, even though overall efficacy seems to wane with time. After four years, reductions were 36 percent for children who received three shots and a booster dose. Missing the booster dose reduced the efficacy against severe malaria to a negligible effect. The vaccine was shown to be less effective for infants. Three doses of vaccine plus a booster reduced the risk of clinical episodes by 26 percent over three years but offered no significant protection against severe malaria.

In a bid to accommodate a larger group and guarantee a sustained availability for the general public, GSK applied for a marketing license with the European Medicines Agency (EMA) in July 2014. GSK treated the project as a non-profit initiative, with most funding coming from the Gates Foundation, a major contributor to malaria eradication.

In July 2015, Mosquirix received a positive scientific opinion from the European Medicines Agency on the proposal for the vaccine to be used to vaccinate children aged 6 weeks to 17 months outside the European Union. It is the world's first licensed malaria vaccine and also the first vaccine licensed for use against a human parasitic disease of any kind. On 23 October 2015, WHO's Strategic Advisory Group of Experts on Immunization (SAGE) and the Malaria Policy Advisory Committee (MPAC) jointly and unexpectedly recommended a pilot implementation in Africa, arguing for the need to rule out any increase in meningitis, something that a post-hoc analysis had found in children who had received the vaccine.

In November 2016, WHO announced that the RTS,S vaccine would be rolled out in pilot projects in three countries in sub-Saharan Africa. This pilot project for vaccination was launched on 23 April 2019 in Malawi, on 30 April 2019 in Ghana, and on 13 September 2019 in Kenya.

In October 2021, the vaccine was endorsed by the World Health Organization (WHO) for "broad use" in children, making it the first malaria vaccine candidate, and first vaccine to address parasitic infection, to receive this recommendation. As of April 2022, 1 million children in Ghana, Kenya and Malawi have received at least one shot of the vaccine.

In August 2022, UNICEF awarded a contract to GSK to purchase 18 million doses of the RTS,S vaccine over three years. More than 30 countries have areas with moderate to high malaria transmission where the vaccine is expected to be useful.

As of April 2023, 1.5 million children in Ghana, Kenya and Malawi had received at least one injection of the vaccine, with more than 4.5 million doses of the vaccine administered through the countries' routine immunization programs. The next 9 countries to receive the vaccine over the next 2 years are Benin, Burkina Faso, Burundi, Cameroon, the Democratic Republic of the Congo, Liberia, Niger, Sierra Leone, and Uganda.

== Components and mechanism ==
RTS,S recombinant protein viruslike particle

The RTS,S vaccine is based on a protein construct first developed by GlaxoSmithKline in 1986. It was named RTS because it was engineered using genes from the repeat ('R') and T-cell epitope ('T') of the pre-erythrocytic circumsporozoite protein (CSP) of the Plasmodium falciparum malaria parasite together with a viral surface antigen ('S') of the hepatitis B virus (HBsAg). This protein was then mixed with additional HBsAg to improve purification, hence the extra "S". Together, these two protein components assemble into soluble virus-like particles similar to the outer shell of a hepatitis B virus.

A chemical adjuvant (AS01, specifically AS01_{E}) was added to increase the immune system response. Infection is prevented by inducing humoral and cellular immunity, with high antibody titers, that block the parasite from infecting the liver.

The T-cell epitope of CSP is O-fucosylated in Plasmodium falciparum and Plasmodium vivax, while the RTS,S vaccine produced in yeast is not.
