= Malaria vaccine =

Vaccine against malaria

Vaccine description
- Target: Malaria
- Vaccine type: Protein subunit

Clinical data
- Trade names: Mosquirix
- Routes of administration: Intramuscular
- ATC code: J07XA01 (WHO)

Legal status
- Legal status: EU: Rx-only; Approved in Ghana, Nigeria

Identifiers
- CAS Number: 149121-47-1
- ChemSpider: none

A malaria vaccine is a vaccine that prevents malaria, a mosquito-borne infectious disease which affected an estimated 249 million people globally in 85 malaria-endemic countries and areas and caused 608,000 deaths in 2022. The first approved vaccine for malaria is RTS,S, known by the brand name Mosquirix. As of April 2023, the vaccine has been given to 1.5 million children living in areas with moderate-to-high malaria transmission. It requires at least three doses in infants by age 2, and a fourth dose extends the protection for another 1–2 years. The vaccine reduces hospital admissions from severe malaria by around 30%.

Research continues with other malaria vaccines. The most effective malaria vaccine is the R21/Matrix-M, with a 77% efficacy rate shown in initial trials and significantly higher antibody levels than with the RTS,S vaccine. It is the first vaccine that meets the World Health Organization's (WHO) goal of a malaria vaccine with at least 75% efficacy, and only the second malaria vaccine to be recommended by the WHO. In April 2023, Ghana's Food and Drugs Authority approved the use of the R21 vaccine for children aged between five months and three years old. Following Ghana's decision, Nigeria provisionally approved the R21 vaccine.

The malaria vaccine is on the World Health Organization's List of Essential Medicines.

== Approved vaccines ==
Which countries include malaria vaccines in their vaccination schedules

=== RTS,S ===
RTS,S recombinant protein viruslike particle

RTS,S/AS01 (brand name Mosquirix) is the first malaria vaccine approved for public use. It requires at least three doses in infants by age 2, with a fourth dose extending the protection for another 1–2 years. The vaccine reduces hospital admissions from severe malaria by around 30%.

RTS,S was developed by PATH Malaria Vaccine Initiative (MVI) and GlaxoSmithKline (GSK) with support from the Bill and Melinda Gates Foundation. It is a recombinant vaccine, consisting of the Plasmodium falciparum circumsporozoite protein (CSP) from the pre-erythrocytic stage. The CSP antigen causes the production of antibodies capable of preventing the invasion of hepatocytes and also elicits a cellular response enabling the destruction of infected hepatocytes. The CSP vaccine presented problems in the trial stage due to its poor immunogenicity. RTS,S attempted to avoid these by fusing the protein with a surface antigen from hepatitis B virus, creating a more potent and immunogenic vaccine. When tested in trials as an emulsion of oil in water and with the added adjuvants of monophosphoryl A and QS21 (SBAS2), the vaccine gave protective immunity to 7 out of 8 volunteers when challenged with P. falciparum.

RTS,S was engineered using genes from the outer protein of P. falciparum malaria parasite and a portion of a hepatitis B virus plus a chemical adjuvant to boost the immune response. Infection is prevented by inducing high antibody titers that block the parasite from infecting the liver. In November 2012, a Phase III trial of RTS,S found that it provided modest protection against both clinical and severe malaria in young infants.

In October 2013, preliminary results of a phase III clinical trial indicated that RTS,S/AS01 reduced the number of cases among young children by almost 50 percent and among infants by around 25 percent. The study ended in 2014. The effects of a booster dose were positive, even though overall efficacy seems to wane with time. After four years, reductions were 36 percent for children who received three shots and a booster dose. Missing the booster dose reduced the efficacy against severe malaria to a negligible effect. The vaccine was shown to be less effective for infants. Three doses of vaccine plus a booster reduced the risk of clinical episodes by 26 percent over three years but offered no significant protection against severe malaria.

In a bid to accommodate a larger group and guarantee sustained availability for the general public, GSK applied for a marketing license with the European Medicines Agency (EMA) in July 2014. GSK treated the project as a non-profit initiative, with most funding coming from the Gates Foundation, a major contributor to malaria eradication.

In July 2015, Mosquirix received a positive scientific opinion from the European Medicines Agency (EMA) on the proposal for the vaccine to be used to vaccinate children aged 6 weeks to 17 months outside the European Union. A pilot project for vaccination was launched on 23 April 2019 in Malawi, on 30 April 2019 in Ghana, and on 13 September 2019 in Kenya.

In October 2021, the vaccine was endorsed by the World Health Organization for "broad use" in children, making it the first malaria vaccine to receive this recommendation.

The vaccine was prequalified by WHO in July 2022. In August 2022, UNICEF awarded a contract to GSK to supply 18 million doses of the RTS,S vaccine over three years. More than 30 countries have areas with moderate to high malaria transmission where the vaccine is expected to be useful.

As of April 2023, 1.5 million children in Ghana, Kenya, and Malawi had received at least one injection of the vaccine, with more than 4.5 million doses of the vaccine administered through the countries' routine immunization programs. The next 9 countries to receive the vaccine over the next 2 years are Benin, Burkina Faso, Burundi, Cameroon, the Democratic Republic of the Congo, Liberia, Niger, Sierra Leone, and Uganda.

=== R21/Matrix-M ===
Comparison between RTS,S and R21

The most effective malaria vaccine is R21/Matrix-M, with 77% efficacy shown in initial trials. It is the first vaccine that meets the World Health Organization's goal of a malaria vaccine with at least 75% efficacy. It was developed through a collaboration involving the Jenner Institute at the University of Oxford, the Kenya Medical Research Institute, the London School of Hygiene and Tropical Medicine, Novavax, and the Serum Institute of India. The trials took place at the Institut de Recherche en Sciences de la Santé in Nanoro, Burkina Faso with Halidou Tinto as the principal investigator. The R21 vaccine uses a circumsporozoite protein (CSP) antigen, at a higher proportion than the RTS,S vaccine. It uses the same HBsAg-linked recombinant structure but contains no excess HBsAg. It includes the Matrix-M adjuvant that is also utilized in the Novavax COVID-19 vaccine.

A phase II trial was reported in April 2021, with a vaccine efficacy of 77% and antibody levels significantly higher than with the RTS,S vaccine. A booster shot of R21/Matrix-M that is given 12 months after the primary three-dose regimen maintains a high efficacy against malaria, providing high protection against symptomatic malaria for at least 2 years. A phase III trial with 4,800 children across four African countries was reported in November 2022, demonstrating vaccine efficacy of 74% against a severe malaria episode. Further data from multiple studies is being collected. As of April 2023 data from the phase III study had not been formally published, but late-stage data from the study was shared with regulatory authorities. In a study published in February 2024, data from the phase III trial showed an efficacy of 78% in children aged 5–17 months and an efficacy of 70% in children aged 18–36 months.

Ghana's Food and Drugs Authority approved the use of the R21 vaccine in April 2023, for use in children aged between five months to three years old. The Serum Institute of India is preparing to produce between 100 and 200 million doses of the vaccine per year, and is constructing a vaccine factory in Accra, Ghana. Following Ghana's decision, Nigeria provisionally approved the R21 vaccine.

In October 2023 the WHO endorsed the R21 vaccine against malaria, end of December 2023 it was added to the list of Prequalified Vaccines.

Further developments for a vaccine that targets the erythrocytic stage of the Malaria parasite have been made, provisionally named RH5.1/Matrix-M, which it is hoped will combine with the R21/Matrix-M pre-erythrocytic vaccine to create an even more efficacious second-generation Malaria vaccine.

== Agents under development ==
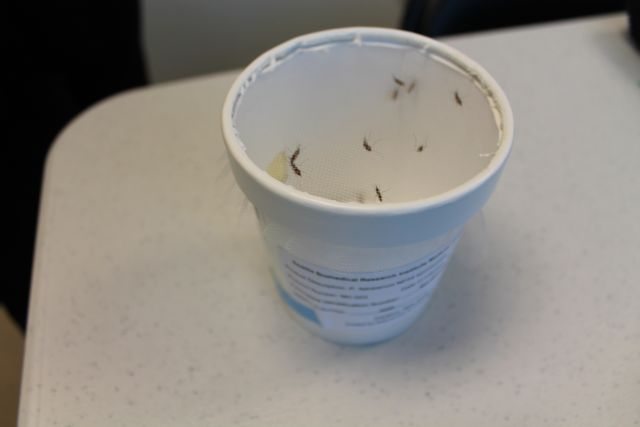
Screened cup of malaria-infected mosquitoes which will infect a volunteer in a clinical trial

A completely effective vaccine is not available for malaria, although several vaccines are under development. Multiple vaccine candidates targeting the blood-stage of the parasite's lifecycle have been insufficient on their own. Several potential vaccines targeting the pre-erythrocytic stage are being developed, with RTS,S and R-21/Matrix-M the two approved options so far.

=== Nanoparticle enhancement of RTS,S ===
In 2015, researchers used a repetitive antigen display technology to engineer a nanoparticle that displayed malaria-specific B cell and T cell epitopes. The particle exhibited icosahedral symmetry and carried on its surface up to 60 copies of the RTS,S protein. The researchers claimed that the density of the protein was much higher than the 14% of the GSK vaccine.

=== PfSPZ vaccine ===
The PfSPZ vaccine is a candidate malaria vaccine developed by Sanaria using radiation-attenuated sporozoites to elicit an immune response. Clinical trials have been promising, with trials in Africa, Europe, and the US protecting over 80% of volunteers. It has been subject to some criticism regarding the ultimate feasibility of large-scale production and delivery in Africa since it must be stored in liquid nitrogen.

The PfSPZ vaccine candidate was granted fast track designation by the U.S. Food and Drug Administration in September 2016.

In April 2019, a phase III trial in Bioko was announced, scheduled to start in early 2020.

=== Other developments ===
- SPf66 is a synthetic peptide-based vaccine developed by the Manuel Elkin Patarroyo team in Colombia and was tested extensively in endemic areas in the 1990s. Clinical trials showed it to be insufficiently effective, with 28% efficacy in South America and minimal or no efficacy in Africa. This vaccine had no protective effect in the largest placebo-controlled randomized trial in South East Asia and was abandoned.
- The CSP (Circum-Sporozoite Protein) was a vaccine developed that initially appeared promising enough to undergo trials. It is also based on the circumsporozoite protein but additionally has the recombinant (Asn-Ala-Pro15Asn-Val-Asp-Pro)2-Leu-Arg(R32LR) protein covalently bound to a purified Pseudomonas aeruginosa toxin (A9). However, at an early stage, a complete lack of protective immunity was demonstrated in those inoculated. The study group used in Kenya had an 82% incidence of parasitaemia while the control group only had an 89% incidence. The vaccine intended to cause an increased T-lymphocyte response in those exposed; this was also not observed.
- The NYVAC-Pf7 multi-stage vaccine attempted to use different technology, incorporating seven P. falciparum antigenic genes. These came from a variety of stages during the lifecycle. CSP and sporozoite surface protein 2 (called PfSSP2) were derived from the sporozoite phase. The liver stage antigen 1 (LSA1), three from the erythrocytic stage (merozoite surface protein 1, serine repeat antigen, and AMA-1), and one sexual stage antigen (the 25-kDa Pfs25) were included. This was first investigated using rhesus monkeys and produced encouraging results: 4 out of the 7 antigens produced specific antibody responses (CSP, PfSSP2, MSP1 and PFs25). Later trials in humans, despite demonstrating cellular immune responses in over 90% of the subjects, had very poor antibody responses. Despite this following administration of the vaccine, some candidates had complete protection when challenged with P. falciparum. This result has warranted ongoing trials.
- In 1995 a field trial involving [NANP]19-5.1 proved to be very successful. Out of 194 children vaccinated, none developed symptomatic malaria in the 12-week follow-up period, and only 8 failed to have higher levels of antibody present. The vaccine consists of the schizont export protein (5.1) and 19 repeats of the sporozoite surface protein [NANP]. Limitations of the technology exist as it contains only 20% peptide and has low levels of immunogenicity. It also does not contain any immunodominant T-cell epitopes.
- A chemical compound undergoing trials for the treatment of tuberculosis and cancer—the JmJc inhibitor ML324 and the antitubercular clinical candidate SQ109—is potentially a new line of drugs to treat malaria and kill the parasite in its infectious stage. More tests still need to be carried out before the compounds can be approved as a viable treatment.

== Considerations ==
The task of developing a preventive vaccine for malaria is a complex process. There are a number of considerations to be made concerning what strategy a potential vaccine should adopt.

=== Parasite diversity ===
P. falciparum has demonstrated the capability, through the development of multiple drug-resistant parasites, for evolutionary change. The Plasmodium species has a very high rate of replication, much higher than that needed to ensure transmission in the parasite's lifecycle. This enables pharmaceutical treatments that are effective at reducing the reproduction rate, but not halting it, to exert a high selection pressure, thus favoring the development of resistance. The process of evolutionary change is one of the key considerations necessary when considering potential vaccine candidates. The development of resistance could cause a significant reduction in the efficacy of any potential vaccine thus rendering useless a carefully developed and effective treatment.

=== Choosing to address the symptom or the source ===
The parasite induces two main response types from the human immune system. These are anti-parasitic immunity and anti-toxic immunity.

- "Anti-parasitic immunity" addresses the source; it consists of an antibody response (humoral immunity) and a cell-mediated immune response. Ideally, a vaccine would enable the development of anti-plasmodial antibodies in addition to generating an elevated cell-mediated response. Potential antigens against which a vaccine could be targeted will be discussed in greater depth later. Antibodies are part of the specific immune response. They exert their effect by activating the complement cascade, stimulating phagocytic cells into endocytosis through adhesion to an external surface of the antigenic substances, thus 'marking' it as offensive. Humoral or cell-mediated immunity consists of many interlinking mechanisms that essentially aim to prevent infection from entering the body (through external barriers or hostile internal environments) and then kill any microorganisms or foreign particles that succeed in penetration. The cell-mediated component consists of many white blood cells (such as monocytes, neutrophils, macrophages, lymphocytes, basophils, mast cells, natural killer cells, and eosinophils) that target foreign bodies by a variety of different mechanisms. In the case of malaria, both systems would be targeted to attempt to increase the potential response generated, thus ensuring the maximum chance of preventing disease.
- "Anti-toxic immunity" addresses the symptoms; it refers to the suppression of the immune response associated with the production of factors that either induce symptoms or reduce the effect that any toxic by-products (of micro-organism presence) have on the development of disease. For example, it has been shown that tumor necrosis factor-alpha has a central role in generating the symptoms experienced in severe P. falciparum malaria. Thus a therapeutic vaccine could target the production of TNF-a, preventing respiratory distress and cerebral symptoms. This approach has serious limitations as it would not reduce the parasitic load; rather, it only reduces the associated pathology. As a result, there are substantial difficulties in evaluating efficacy in human trials.

Taking this information into consideration an ideal vaccine candidate would attempt to generate a more substantial cell-mediated and antibody response on parasite presentation. This would have the benefit of increasing the rate of parasite clearance, thus reducing the experienced symptoms and providing a level of consistent future immunity against the parasite.

=== Potential targets ===
Potential vaccine targets in the malaria lifecycle (Doolan and Hoffman)
Parasite stage	Target
Sporozoite	Hepatocyte invasion; direct anti-sporozite
Hepatozoite	Direct anti-hepatozoite.
Asexual erythrocytic	Anti-host erythrocyte, antibodies blocking invasion; anti receptor ligand, anti-soluble toxin
Gametocyte	Anti-gametocyte. Anti-host erythrocyte, antibodies blocking fertilisation, antibodies blocking egress from the mosquito midgut.

By their very nature, protozoa are more complex organisms than bacteria and viruses, with more complicated structures and lifecycles. This presents problems in vaccine development but also increases the number of potential targets for a vaccine. These have been summarised into the lifecycle stage and the antibodies that could potentially elicit an immune response.

The epidemiology of malaria varies enormously across the globe and has led to the belief that it may be necessary to adopt very different vaccine development strategies to target different populations. A Type 1 vaccine is suggested for those exposed mostly to P. falciparum malaria in sub-Saharan Africa, with the primary objective to reduce the number of severe malaria cases and deaths in infants and children exposed to high transmission rates. The Type 2 vaccine could be thought of as a 'travelers' vaccine,' aiming to prevent all clinical symptoms in individuals with no previous exposure. This is another major public health problem, with malaria presenting as one of the most substantial threats to travelers' health. Problems with the available pharmaceutical therapies include costs, availability, adverse effects, contraindications, inconvenience, and compliance, many of which would be reduced or eliminated if an effective (greater than 85–90%) vaccine was developed.

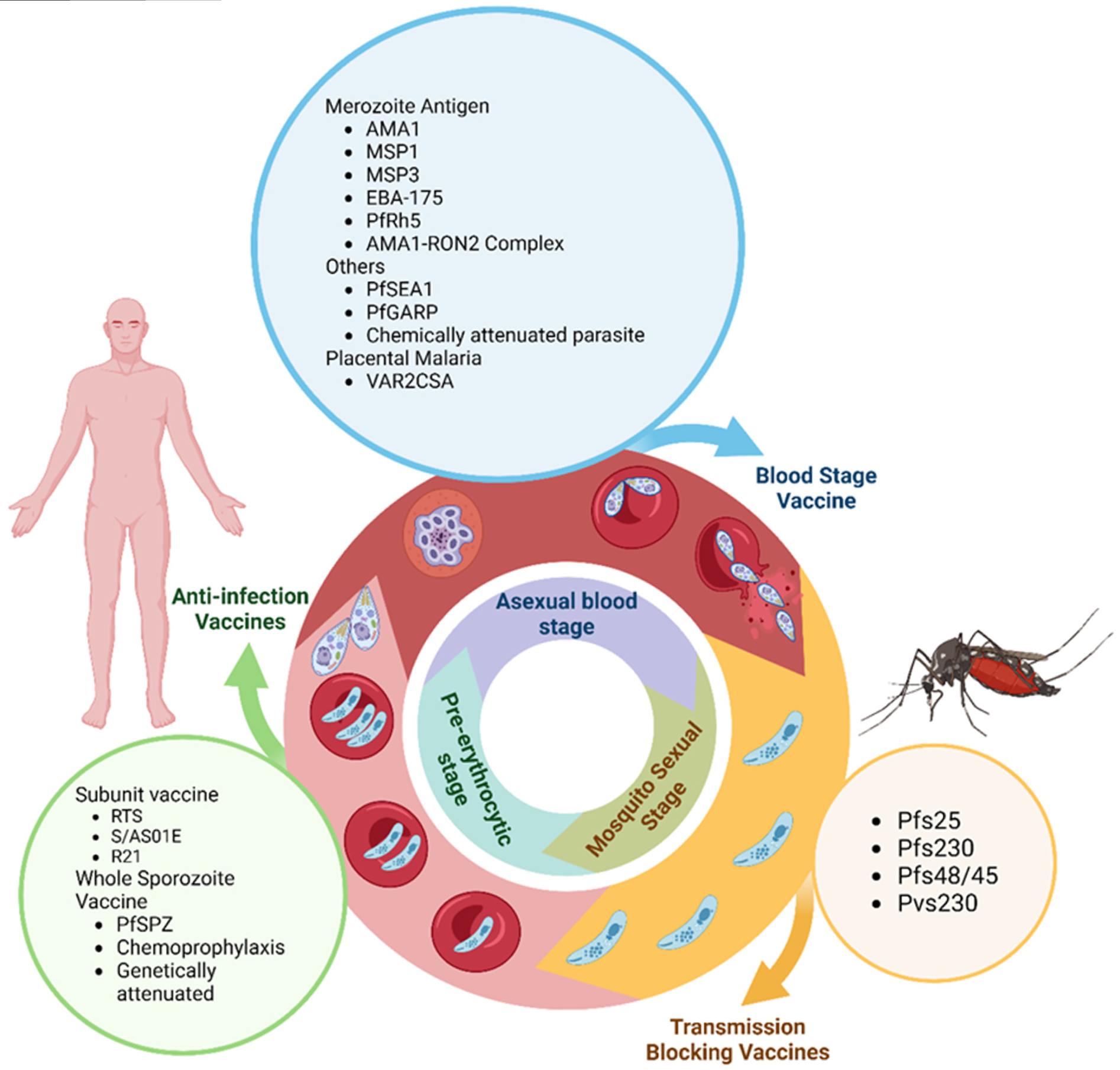
Malaria vaccines acting on different stages of the life cycle of the parasite

The lifecycle of the malaria parasite is particularly complex, presenting initial developmental problems. Despite the huge number of vaccines available, none target parasitic infections. The distinct developmental stages involved in the lifecycle present numerous opportunities for targeting antigens, thus potentially eliciting an immune response. Theoretically, each developmental stage could have a vaccine developed specifically to target the parasite. Moreover, any vaccine produced would ideally have the ability to be of therapeutic value as well as preventing further transmission and is likely to consist of a combination of antigens from different phases of the parasite's development. More than 30 of these antigens are being researched by teams all over the world in the hope of identifying a combination that can elicit immunity in the inoculated individual. Some of the approaches involve surface expression of the antigen, inhibitory effects of specific antibodies on the lifecycle, and the protective effects through immunization or passive transfer of antibodies between an immune and a non-immune host. The majority of research into malarial vaccines has focused on the Plasmodium falciparum strain due to the high mortality caused by the parasite and the ease of carrying out in vitro/in vivo studies. The earliest vaccines attempted to use the parasitic circumsporozoite protein (CSP). This is the most dominant surface antigen of the initial pre-erythrocytic phase. However, problems were encountered due to low efficacy, reactogenicity and low immunogenicity.

- The initial stage in the lifecycle, following inoculation, is a relatively short "pre-erythrocytic" or "hepatic" phase. A vaccine at this stage must have the ability to protect against sporozoites invading and possibly inhibiting the development of parasites in the hepatocytes (through inducing cytotoxic T-lymphocytes that can destroy the infected liver cells). However, if any sporozoites evaded the immune system they would then have the potential to be symptomatic and cause the clinical disease.
- The second phase of the lifecycle is the "erythrocytic" or blood phase. A vaccine here could prevent merozoite multiplication or the invasion of red blood cells. This approach is complicated by the lack of MHC molecule expression on the surface of erythrocytes. Instead, malarial antigens are expressed, and it is this towards which the antibodies could potentially be directed. Another approach would be to attempt to block the process of erythrocyte adherence to blood vessel walls. It is thought that this process is accountable for much of the clinical syndrome associated with malarial infection; therefore, a vaccine given during this stage would be therapeutic and hence administered during clinical episodes to prevent further deterioration.
- The last phase of the lifecycle that has the potential to be targeted by a vaccine is the "sexual stage". This would not give any protective benefits to the individual inoculated but would prevent further transmission of the parasite by preventing the gametocytes from producing multiple sporozoites in the gut wall of the mosquito. It therefore would be used as part of a policy directed at eliminating the parasite from areas of low prevalence or to prevent the development and spread of vaccine-resistant parasites. This type of transmission-blocking vaccine is potentially very important. The evolution of resistance in the malaria parasite occurs very quickly, potentially making any vaccine redundant within a few generations. This approach to the prevention of spread is therefore essential.
- Another approach is to target the protein kinases, which are present during the entire lifecycle of the malaria parasite. Research is underway on this, yet production of an actual vaccine targeting these protein kinases may still take a long time.
- Report of a vaccine candidate capable of neutralizing all tested strains of Plasmodium falciparum, the most deadly form of the parasite causing malaria, was published in Nature Communications by a team of scientists from the University of Oxford in 2011. The viral vector vaccine, targeting a full-length P. falciparum reticulocyte-binding protein homologue 5 (PfRH5) was found to induce an antibody response in an animal model. The results of this new vaccine confirmed the utility of a key discovery reported by scientists at the Wellcome Trust Sanger Institute, published in Nature. The earlier publication reported P. falciparum relies on a red blood cell surface receptor, known as 'basigin', to invade the cells by binding a protein PfRH5 to the receptor. Unlike other antigens of the malaria parasite which are often genetically diverse, the PfRH5 antigen appears to have little genetic diversity. It was found to induce a very low antibody response in people naturally exposed to the parasite. The high susceptibility of PfRH5 to the cross-strain neutralizing vaccine-induced antibody demonstrated a significant promise for preventing malaria in the long and often difficult road of vaccine development. According to Professor Adrian Hill, a Wellcome Trust Senior Investigator at the University of Oxford, the next step would be the safety tests of this vaccine. At the time (2011) it was projected that if these proved successful, the clinical trials in patients could begin within two to three years.
- PfEMP1, one of the proteins known as variant surface antigens (VSAs) produced by Plasmodium falciparum, was found to be a key target of the immune system's response against the parasite. Studies of blood samples from 296 mostly Kenyan children by researchers of Burnet Institute and their cooperators showed that antibodies against PfEMP1 provide protective immunity, while antibodies developed against other surface antigens do not. Their results demonstrated that PfEMP1 could be a target for developing an effective vaccine that will reduce the risk of developing malaria.
- Plasmodium vivax is the common malaria species found in India, Southeast Asia, and South America. It can stay dormant in the liver and reemerge years later to elicit new infections. Two key proteins involved in the invasion of the red blood cells (RBC) by P. vivax are potential targets for drug or vaccine development. When the Duffy binding protein (DBP) of P. vivax binds the Duffy antigen (DARC) on the surface of the RBC, the process for the parasite to enter the RBC is initiated. Structures of the core region of DARC and the receptor binding pocket of DBP have been mapped by scientists at the Washington University in St. Louis. The researchers found that the binding is a two-step process that involves two copies of the parasite protein acting together like a pair of tongs that "clamp" two copies of DARC. Antibodies that interfere with the binding by either targeting the key region of the DARC or the DBP will prevent the infection.
- Antibodies against the Schizont Egress Antigen-1 (PfSEA-1) were found to disable the parasite's ability to rupture from the infected red blood cells (RBCs), thus preventing it from continuing with its lifecycle. Researchers from Rhode Island Hospital identified Plasmodium falciparum PfSEA-1, a 244 kd malaria antigen expressed in the schizont-infected RBCs. Mice vaccinated with the recombinant PfSEA-1 produced antibodies that interrupted the schizont rupture from the RBCs and decreased the parasite replication. The vaccine protected the mice from the lethal challenge of the parasite. Tanzanian and Kenyan children who have antibodies to PfSEA-1 were found to have fewer parasites in their bloodstream and a milder case of malaria. By blocking the schizont outlet, the PfSEA-1 vaccine may work synergistically with vaccines targeting the other stages of the malaria lifecycle such as hepatocyte and RBC invasion.

=== Mix of antigenic components ===
Increasing the potential immunity generated against Plasmodia can be achieved by attempting to target multiple phases in the lifecycle. This is additionally beneficial in reducing the possibility of resistant parasites developing. The use of multiple-parasite antigens can therefore have a synergistic or additive effect.

One of the most successful vaccine candidates in clinical trials consists of recombinant antigenic proteins to the circumsporozoite protein.

== History ==
Research shows that if immunoglobulin is taken from immune adults, purified, and then given to individuals who have no protective immunity, some protection can be gained.

=== Irradiated mosquitoes ===
In 1967, it was reported that a level of immunity to the Plasmodium berghei parasite could be given to mice by exposing them to sporozoites that had been irradiated by x-rays. Subsequent human studies in the 1970s showed that humans could be immunized against Plasmodium vivax and Plasmodium falciparum by exposing them to the bites of significant numbers of irradiated mosquitos.

From 1989 to 1999, eleven volunteers recruited from the United States Public Health Service, United States Army, and United States Navy were immunized against Plasmodium falciparum by the bites of 1001–2927 mosquitoes that had been irradiated with 15,000 rads of gamma rays from a Co-60 or Cs-137 source. This level of radiation is sufficient to attenuate the malaria parasites so that, while they can still enter hepatic cells, they cannot develop into schizonts nor infect red blood cells. Over 42 weeks, 24 of 26 tests on the volunteers showed that they were protected from malaria.
