= Reactogenicity =

Expected reaction to a vaccine

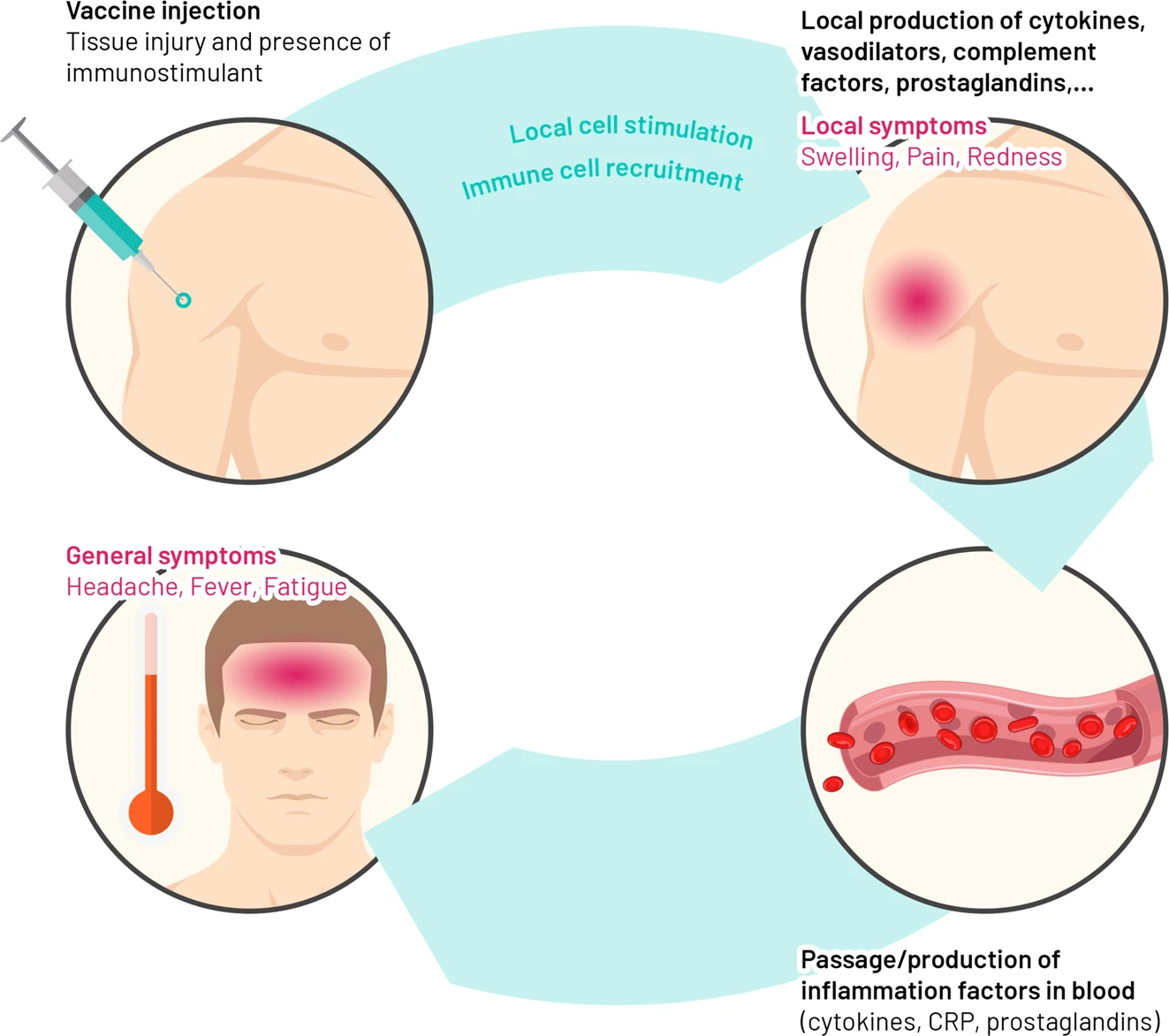
Mechanisms underlying the cause of reactogenicity symptoms

In clinical trials, reactogenicity is the capacity of a vaccine to produce common, "expected" adverse reactions, especially excessive immunological responses and associated signs and symptoms, including fever and sore arm at the injection site. Other manifestations of reactogenicity typically identified in such trials include bruising, redness, induration, and swelling.

== Origin ==
The term reactogenicity was coined by the US Food and Drug Administration (FDA). All vaccines can induce reactogenicity, but reactogenicity is more likely in vaccines containing an adjuvant, which is a chemical additive intended for enhancing the recipient's immune response to the antigen that is present in a vaccine. Reactogenicity describes the immediate short-term reactions of a system to vaccines and should not be confused with the long-term consequences sequelae. Assessments of reactogenicity are carried out to evaluate the safety and usability of an experimental vaccine (see Investigational New Drug). It is unclear whether a higher degree of reactogenicity to a vaccine correlates with more severe adverse events, which would require hospitalization or are life-threatening. Adverse events have been linked to a higher degree of reactogenicity; however, the links might have been coincidental. After assessing large databases relating to these events for many years, the FDA has not been able to make such a correlation.

== Definition ==
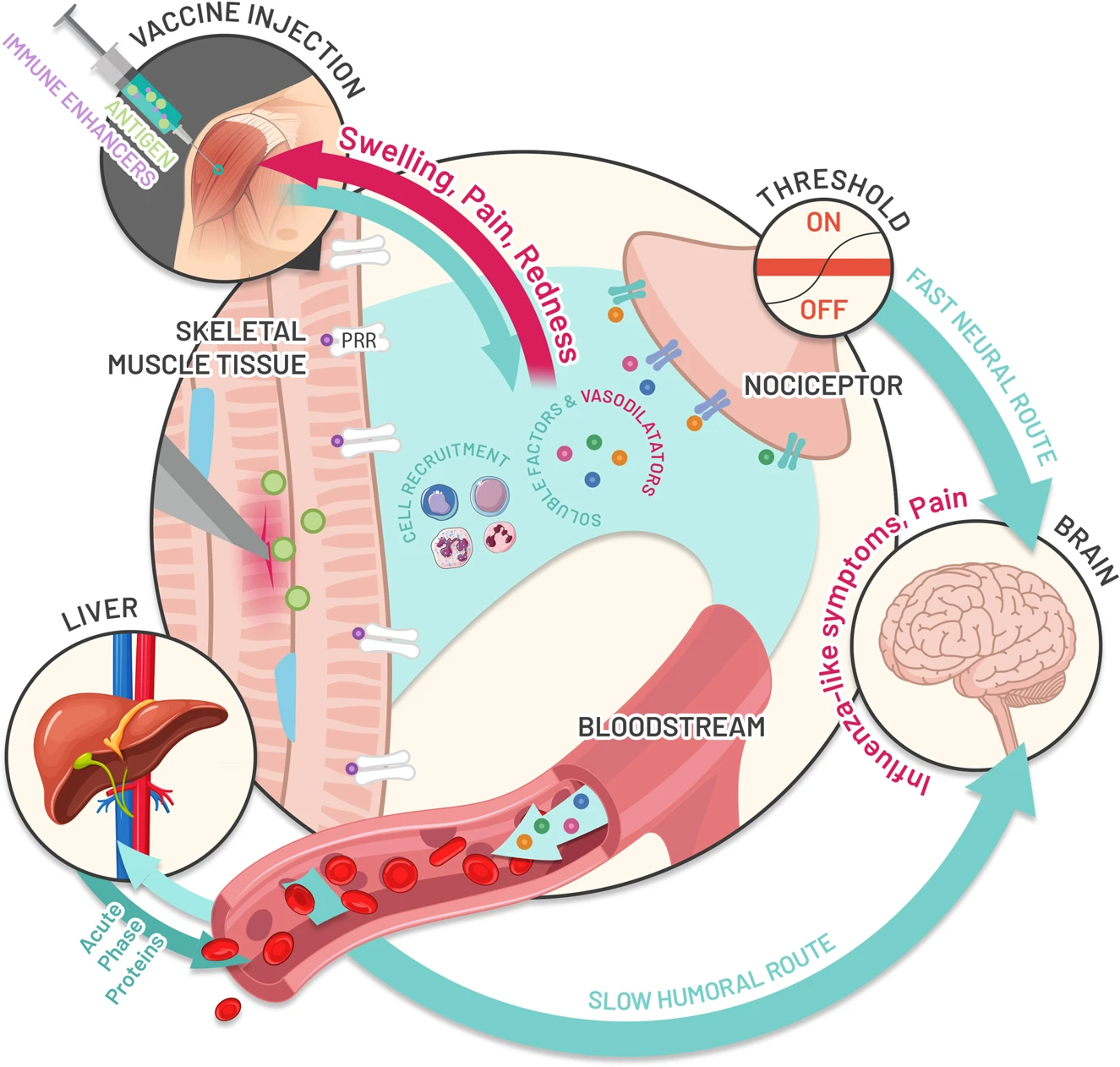
Hypothesised link between the innate immune response induced by vaccination and reactogenicity

The US National Institutes of Health (NIH) has provided the following definition of reactogenicity:

Reactogenicity events are AEs that are common and known to occur for the intervention/investigational product being studied and should be collected in a standard, systematic format using a grading scale based on functional assessment or magnitude of reaction. Provide a definition of expected vs unexpected AEs and local vs systemic events, based on the risk profile of the intervention/investigational product. This information is found on the IB or package insert. Typically, reactogenicity AEs are solicited and collected on memory cards and documented on a reactogenicity CRF. This information comes from the participant who may also have a memory aid to help recollect their symptoms.

The following is an example of a functional scale for assessing reactogenicity or other parameters not specifically listed in the toxicity table:
0 = Absence of the indicated symptom
1 = Mild (awareness of a symptom but the symptom is easily tolerated)
2 = Moderate (discomfort enough to cause interference with usual activity)
3 = Severe (incapacitating; unable to perform usual activities; requires absenteeism or bed rest)
4 = Life-threatening

== See also ==
- Vaccine hesitancy
