= List of Dialog event participants =

Attendee list of elite organization gathering

Dialog is a private, invitation-only gathering for elite and influential members, founded in 2006.

In 2026, hacktivist maia arson crimew managed to obtain a list of Dialog members by accessing the official website and leaked it to the press.

== General sources of origin ==
=== In registration records for 2026 event ===
The leaked records show 222 people signed up to attend the 2026 retreat. Of that group, 87 are first-time attendees, while others have been attending since the organization's beginning 20 years ago. The people who registered for the event may be full members, guests of members, or leading the conference sessions.

| Last, First | Sphere | Role/Affiliation |
|---|---|---|
| Abramzon, Shmuel | Government & Politics | Chief Economist, Israel Ministry of Finance |
| Al-Saud, Reema (on both lists) | Government & Politics | Ambassador of Saudi Arabia to the U.S. |
| Bessent, Scott (on both lists) | Government & Politics | Secretary, U.S. Treasury |
| Booker, Cory (on both lists) | Government & Politics | Senator (New Jersey), U.S. Senate |
| Brolin, Josh | Arts & Entertainment | Actor; Nominated by Graves, Ryan, former CEO, Uber |
| Cook, Scott | Technology & AI | Co-founder and Chairman, Intuit |
| Cruz, Ted (on both lists) | Government & Politics | Senator (Texas), U.S. Senate |
| Gevelber, Lisa | Technology & AI | Global Vice President, Google |
| Goettler, Peter | Government & Politics | President, Cato Institute |
| Greenblatt, Jonathan | Nonprofit & Advocacy | CEO, Anti-Defamation League |
| Grynkewich, Alexus | Military & Defense | Commanding general, Supreme Allied Commander Europe & USEUCOM; In attendance records for conferences since 2021. |
| Hoffman, Hallie | Government & Politics | Chief of Staff, Drug Enforcement Administration |
| Hsiao, Teresa | Arts & Entertainment | Television writer and producer |
| Kasparov, Garry (on both lists) | Nonprofit & Advocacy | Former World Chess Champion. Democracy advocate |
| Kravis, Henry (on both lists) | Finance & Investment | Co-founder/chair/CEO, Kohlberg Kravis Roberts & Co. |
| Kroszner, Randy | Finance & Investment | Committee, Bank of England's Financial Policy. Former Governor, Federal Reserve |
| Lee, Isaac | Business & Industry | Chair and CEO, Hybe America |
| Levinson, Molly | Media & Journalism | Founder, The Levinson Group |
| Lue, Tom | Technology & AI | Global Affairs, Google DeepMind |
| McChrystal, Stanley (on both lists) | Military & Defense | Founder and CEO, McChrystal Group. Former General, U.S. Army |
| Mekhennet, Souad | Media & Journalism | National Security Correspondent, The Washington Post |
| Musk, Elon (on both lists) | Technology & AI | Founder and CEO, SpaceX. Co-founder and CEO, Tesla Motors |
| Myerson, Roger | Academia & Research | Economist, University of Chicago |
| Price, Eva | Arts & Entertainment | CEO, Maximum Entertainment Productions |
| Ruane, Lynn | Government & Politics | Senator, Seanad Éireann (Trinity College Dublin panel); Acknowledged: Ruane planned to participate in the 2026 event but has since withdrawn after learning details about the group. |
| Sellitto, Michael | Technology & AI | Global Affairs, Anthropic |
| Shields, Zach | Arts & Entertainment | Executive producer and writer |
| Spahn, Jens (on both lists) | Government & Politics | Member of Parliament, German Bundestag. Fmr. Federal Minister of Health, Germany; Acknowledged: Spahn confirmed he was invited to the 2026 Dialog retreat and will not attend. Later confirmed he attended the 2018 Ireland, 2019 Italy, 2022 Portugal, 2023 Spain, and 2024 Germany retreats. |
| Stowers, Ryan | Nonprofit & Advocacy | Executive Director, Charles Koch Foundation |
| Thompson, Nick (on both lists) | Media & Journalism | CEO, The Atlantic. Fmr. Editor-in-chief, Wired Magazine |

=== Dialog employees ===
- Hoffman, Auren, Dialog chair
- Grinberg, Raffi, Dialog executive director

=== In the website directory ===
The code for the Dialog website had an unprotected list of people labeled "Directory List", and this was initially reported as a membership directory. Later reporting stated that the list included non-members, event speakers, and outside guests from years past. The website directory listed 113 people.

| Last, First | Sphere | Role/Affiliation |
|---|---|---|
| Akhund, Immad | Technology & AI | Founder and CEO, Mercury Technologies |
| Al Faisal Al Saud, Turki | Government & Politics | Founder, King Faisal Foundation. Former Minister of Intelligence, Saudi Arabia |
| Al-Saud, Reema (on both lists) | Government & Politics | Ambassador of Saudi Arabia to the U.S. |
| Arnold, John | Finance & Investment | Co-chair, Arnold Ventures. Former founder, Centaurus Advisors; Acknowledged: Arnold confirmed he attended Dialog events in the past, as recently as 2023. |
| Athey, Susan | Academia & Research | Professor, Stanford Graduate School of Business. Former Chief Economist, Antitrust Division, U.S. Department of Justice |
| Attia, Peter | Academia & Research | Physician, Attia Medical. Author, Outlive |
| Belsky, Scott | Technology & AI | Partner, A24 Films. Former Chief Strategy Officer/Product Officer, Adobe Inc. Founder, Behance |
| Berggruen, Nicolas | Finance & Investment | Founder and President, Berggruen Holdings |
| Bessent, Scott (on both lists) | Government & Politics | Secretary, U.S. Treasury |
| Bharara, Preet | Law & Justice | Former U.S. Attorney, New York Southern District |
| Blackburn, Elizabeth | Academia & Research | Former President, Salk Institute for Biological Studies. Nobel Prize winner |
| Bond, Sarah | Technology & AI | President of Xbox |
| Booker, Cory (on both lists) | Government & Politics | Senator (New Jersey), U.S. Senate |
| Brand, Rachel | Law & Justice | Chief Legal Officer/Corporate Secretary, Walmart. Former Associate Attorney General, U.S. Department of Justice |
| Braun, Scooter | Arts & Entertainment | CEO, Hybe America. Founder, Ithaca Holdings |
| Briger, Pete | Finance & Investment | Principal and Chairman of the Board, Fortress Investment Group |
| Brockman, Greg | Technology & AI | Co-founder and President, OpenAI. Former CTO, Stripe, Inc. |
| Bronstein, Manuel | Technology & AI | Chief Product Officer, Roblox |
| Brown, Peter | Finance & Investment | CEO, Renaissance Technologies |
| Brown Duckett, Thasunda | Finance & Investment | President and CEO, TIAA |
| Bush, Sophia | Arts & Entertainment | Actress, One Tree Hill; Acknowledged: Bush stated she attended a Dialog retreat but never met Thiel. |
| Cannon-Brookes, Mike | Technology & AI | Co-founder/CEO, Atlassian |
| Carvalho, Cesar | Technology & AI | Co-founder/CEO, Wellhub |
| Casares, Wences | Technology & AI | Founder and former CEO, Xapo Bank. Founder: Wanako Games, Lemon Wallet |
| Castro, Julian | Government & Politics | Former Secretary, U.S. Department of Housing and Urban Development |
| Cialdini, Bob | Media & Journalism | Author, Influence: Science and Practice |
| Clifford, Matt | Government & Politics | Prime Minister's Advisor on AI Opportunities, U.K. Government. Co-founder, Entrepreneurs First and Code First Girls; Denied: Clifford said he was invited to the 2026 event but was not going to attend. |
| Cochran, Caroline | Technology & AI | Co-founder and COO, Oklo Inc. |
| Cohler, Matt | Finance & Investment | Former General Partner, Benchmark |
| Cook, Scott | Technology & AI | Co-founder and Chairman, Intuit |
| Cowen, Tyler | Academia & Research | Professor of Economics, George Mason University and Director, Mercatus Center |
| Cruz, Ted (on both lists) | Government & Politics | Senator (Texas), U.S. Senate |
| D'Angelo, Adam | Technology & AI | Co-founder and CEO, Quora. Former CTO, Facebook |
| Daniels, Mitch | Government & Politics | Former Governor, State of Indiana. Former President, Purdue University |
| Driscoll, Dan | Government & Politics | Secretary, U.S. Army |
| Duhigg, Charles | Media & Journalism | Author, The Power of Habit, Supercommunicators |
| Ells, Steve | Business & Industry | Founder & Fmr. CEO, Chipotle |
| Ferriss, Tim | Media & Journalism | Author, The 4-Hour Workweek, The 4-Hour Body, The 4-Hour Chef. Host, The Tim Ferriss Show |
| Galperin, Marcos | Technology & AI | Co-Founder & CEO, MercadoLibre |
| Gawande, Atul | Academia & Research | Author, Being Mortal, The Checklist Manifesto. Fmr. Assistant Administrator for Global Health, USAID |
| Goldstein, Tom | Law & Justice | Partner, Goldstein & Russell. Founder & Fmr. Publisher, SCOTUSblog.com |
| Gordon-Levitt, Joseph | Arts & Entertainment | Actor, 500 Days of Summer, Inception, Looper, Snowden Acknowledged: Gordon-Levitt stated he attended two Dialog retreats but never met Thiel. |
| Grant, Adam | Academia & Research | Organizational Psychologist, Wharton School of Management. Author, Think Again, Originals, Give and Take |
| Hacker, Severin | Technology & AI | Co-Founder & CTO, Duolingo |
| Haidt, Jonathan | Academia & Research | Professor, Stern School of Business, NYU. Author, The Anxious Generation, The Righteous Mind, The Coddling of the American Mind |
| Hamburg, Peggy | Government & Politics | Fmr. Commissioner, U.S. Food & Drug Administration |
| Harris, Sam | Media & Journalism | Podcast Host, Making Sense. Author, Free Will, Lying, Waking Up |
| Himes, Jim | Government & Politics | Congressman (Connecticut), U.S. House of Representatives; Acknowledged/denied: Himes confirmed he attended one retreat in about 2016, but denied he is affiliated with the group beyond that. |
| Hoffman, Auren | Technology & AI | CEO, NQB8. Chairman & Fmr. CEO, SafeGraph. Founder & Fmr. CEO, LiveRamp. Chairman, Dialog |
| Hoffman, Reid | Technology & AI | Partner, Greylock Partners. Co-Founder & Fmr. Executive Chairman, LinkedIn |
| Hur, Rob | Law & Justice | Fmr. Special Counsel, U.S. Department of Justice |
| Jain, Bob | Finance & Investment | CIO, Millennium Management. Founder, Jain Family Institute |
| Johnson, Bryan | Technology & AI | Founder & CEO: Kernel, Blueprint |
| Kallas, Kaja | Government & Politics | Vice President, European Commission. Fmr. Prime Minister, Estonia; Denied: The EU [sic] denies that she will attend the 2026 event in Ireland, and says she is not an organization member. |
| Kapadia, Gaurva | Finance & Investment | Founder & CEO, XN |
| Karniol-Tambour, Karen | Finance & Investment | Co-CIO, Bridgewater Associates |
| Kasparov, Garry (on both lists) | Nonprofit & Advocacy | Fmr. Member, Russian Opposition Movement's Coordinating Council. Fmr. World Chess Champion |
| Katyal, Neal | Law & Justice | Partner, Milbank. Fmr. Partner & Supreme Court Practice Leader, Hogan Lovells |
| Khaqan Abbasi, Shahid | Government & Politics | Fmr. Prime Minister, Pakistan. Founder, Airblue |
| Klein, Ezra | Media & Journalism | Opinion Columnist, The New York Times. Founder & Fmr. Editor-in-chief, Vox. Host, The Ezra Klein Show |
| Kōno, Tarō | Government & Politics | Digital Minister, Japan. Fmr. Minister of Defense, Japan |
| Kravis, Henry (on both lists) | Finance & Investment | Co-Founder, Co-Chairman & Co-CEO, Kohlberg Kravis Roberts & Co. |
| Kushner, Jared | Finance & Investment | Founder, Affinity Partners |
| Kwon, Jason | Technology & AI | Chief Strategy Officer, OpenAI |
| Larsen, Chris | Technology & AI | Co-Founder and Executive Chairman, Ripple |
| Leo, Leonard | Nonprofit & Advocacy | Co-Chairman & Fmr. Executive Vice President, Federalist Society |
| Levin, Jon | Academia & Research | President, Stanford University |
| Liu, Howie | Technology & AI | Founder & CEO, Airtable |
| Lonsdale, Joe | Finance & Investment | Founding Partner, 8VC. Co-Founder: Palantir, Addepar |
| Malka, Micky | Finance & Investment | Founder & Managing Partner, Ribbit Capital |
| McChrystal, Stan (on both lists) | Military & Defense | Founder & CEO, McChrystal Group. Fmr. General, U.S. Army |
| Mohan, Neal | Technology & AI | CEO, YouTube |
| Monaco, Lisa | Law & Justice | Fmr. Deputy Attorney General, U.S. Department of Justice |
| Moore, Wes | Government & Politics | Governor, State of Maryland; Acknowledged: Moore stated he spoke at a Dialog retreat 13 years ago, and never met Thiel. |
| Musk, Elon (on both lists) | Technology & AI | Founder & CEO, SpaceX. Co-Founder & CEO, Tesla Motors |
| Mutlu, Demet | Business & Industry | Founder & CEO, Trendyol Group |
| Narasimhan, Vas | Business & Industry | CEO, Novartis |
| Norquist, Grover | Nonprofit & Advocacy | President, Americans for Tax Reform |
| Novogratz, Mike | Finance & Investment | CEO, Galaxy Digital. Fmr. CIO, Fortress Investment Group |
| O'Neill, Jim | Government & Politics | Nominee for Deputy Secretary, U.S. Department of Health and Human Services. Co-Founder, Thiel Fellowship |
| Palihapitiya, Chamath | Finance & Investment | Founder & CEO, Social Capital LP. Co-Owner, Golden State Warriors |
| Pasek, Benj | Arts & Entertainment | Songwriter & Producer: La La Land, The Greatest Showman, Dear Evan Hansen. Emmy, Grammy, Oscar, Tony winner |
| Pink, Daniel | Media & Journalism | Author: Drive, To Sell is Human, The Power of Regret. Fmr. Chief Speechwriter for Vice President Al Gore |
| Pinker, Steven | Academia & Research | Professor, Harvard University. Author: Enlightenment Now, The Better Angels of Our Nature |
| Polis, Jared | Government & Politics | Governor, State of Colorado Denied: The office of Colorado Governor officially denied his ever participation in a statement to Axios. |
| Ross, Jonathan | Technology & AI | Founder & CEO, Groq |
| Rubin, Gretchen | Media & Journalism | Host, Happier with Gretchen Rubin. Author: The Happiness Project, Better Than Before, The Four Tendencies |
| Rubin, Robert | Government & Politics | Fmr. Secretary, U.S. Treasury. Fmr. Co-Chairman, Goldman Sachs |
| Saud Nasir Al-Sabah, Sheikh Nawaf | Business & Industry | CEO, Kuwait Petroleum Corporation |
| Scharf, Will | Government & Politics | White House staff secretary; Co-Founder & CTO, Oscar Health |
| Schlosser, Mario | Technology & AI | CEO and Founder, Oscar |
| Schmidt, Eric | Technology & AI | Founder, Schmidt Futures. Fmr. CEO: Google, Alphabet |
| Schulman, Dan | Technology & AI | Fmr. President & CEO, PayPal |
| Scott, Drew | Arts & Entertainment | Co-Founder, Scott Brothers Global. Co-Host, Property Brothers |
| Scott, Kim | Media & Journalism | Author, Radical Candor |
| Shadbolt, Pete | Technology & AI | Founder & Chief Science Officer, PsiQuantum |
| Siddiqui, Ali | Government & Politics | Board Chair, OnZero. Fmr. Ambassador of Pakistan to the U.S. |
| Silbert, Barry | Finance & Investment | Founder & CEO, Digital Currency Group |
| Slaughter, Anne-Marie | Academia & Research | CEO, New America. Professor, Princeton. Fmr. Director of Policy Planning, U.S. Department of State |
| Songhurst, Charlie | Technology & AI | Board Director, Meta. Fmr. Head of Corporate Strategy, Microsoft |
| Spahn, Jens (on both lists) | Government & Politics | Member of Parliament, German Bundestag. Fmr. Federal Minister of Health, Germany; Acknowledged: Spahn confirmed he was invited to the 2026 Dialog retreat and will not attend. Later confirmed he attended the 2018 Ireland, 2019 Italy, 2022 Portugal, 2023 Spain, and 2024 Germany retreats. |
| Stephens, Bret | Media & Journalism | Opinion Columnist & Associate Editor, The New York Times. Pulitzer Prize winner |
| Stephenson, Scott | Business & Industry | Chairman, President & CEO, Verisk Analytics |
| Sternlicht, Barry | Finance & Investment | Co-Founder, Chairman & CEO, Starwood Capital Group |
| Summers, Lawrence | Academia & Research | Fmr. President, Harvard University. Fmr. Secretary, U.S. Treasury |
| Teller, Astro | Technology & AI | Captain of Moonshots, X |
| Thiel, Peter | Finance & Investment | Co-Founder: Founders Fund, Palantir, PayPal, Dialog |
| Thompson, Nick (on both lists) | Media & Journalism | CEO, The Atlantic. Fmr. Editor-in-chief, Wired Magazine |
| Townsend, John | Media & Journalism | Author, Boundaries |
| Tugendhat, Tom | Government & Politics | Member of Parliament, United Kingdom |
| Urban, Tim | Media & Journalism | Writer & Illustrator, Wait But Why. Author, What's Our Problem? |
| Warren, Rick | Nonprofit & Advocacy | Author, The Purpose Driven Life. Podcast Host, Pastor Rick's Daily Hope |
| Zelnick, Strauss | Business & Industry | Chairman & CEO, Take-Two Interactive Software |
| Zilis, Shivon | Technology & AI | Director, Neuralink |

=== Past Dialog participants ===
| Last, First | Sphere | Role/Affiliation |
|---|---|---|
| Al-Saud, Reema | Government & Politics | Ambassador of Saudi Arabia to the U.S. |
| Bessent, Scott | Government & Politics | Secretary, U.S. Treasury |
| Booker, Cory | Government & Politics | Senator (New Jersey), U.S. Senate |
| Bush, Sophia | Arts & Entertainment | Actress, One Tree Hill |
| Cruz, Ted | Government & Politics | Senator (Texas), U.S. Senate |
| Gabbard, Tulsi | Government & Politics | Director of National Intelligence |
| Haidt, Jonathan | Academia & Research | Professor, Stern School of Business, NYU |
| Haass, Richard | Nonprofit & Advocacy | Fmr. President, Council on Foreign Relations |
| Hur, Rob | Law & Justice | Fmr. Special Counsel, U.S. Department of Justice |
| Kallas, Kaja | Government & Politics | Vice President, European Commission. Fmr. Prime Minister, Estonia |
| Kasparov, Garry | Nonprofit & Advocacy | Fmr. World Chess Champion. Democracy advocate |
| Kravis, Henry | Finance & Investment | Co-Founder, Co-Chairman & Co-CEO, Kohlberg Kravis Roberts & Co. |
| Kushner, Jared | Finance & Investment | Founder, Affinity Partners |
| Moore, Wes | Government & Politics | Governor, State of Maryland |
| Musk, Elon | Technology & AI | Founder & CEO, SpaceX. Co-Founder & CEO, Tesla Motors |
| Norquist, Grover | Nonprofit & Advocacy | President, Americans for Tax Reform |
| Palihapitiya, Chamath | Finance & Investment | Founder & CEO, Social Capital LP |
| Schmidt, Eric | Technology & AI | Founder, Schmidt Futures. Fmr. CEO: Google, Alphabet |
| Slaughter, Anne-Marie | Academia & Research | CEO, New America. Professor, Princeton |
| Summers, Lawrence | Academia & Research | Fmr. President, Harvard University. Fmr. Secretary, U.S. Treasury |
| Warren, Rick | Nonprofit & Advocacy | Author, The Purpose Driven Life. Podcast Host, Pastor Rick's Daily Hope |

== See also ==
- Bilderberg meeting
- Bohemian Grove
- World Economic Forum
