= Ilan Gur =

American CEO and entrepreneur

Ilan Gur is an American chief executive officer and entrepreneur. In 2022 he was appointed as the inaugural Chief Executive Officer of the UK's Advanced Research and Invention Agency (ARIA), a non-departmental public body that funds high-risk science projects. He left ARIA in early 2026 and began his new role as a senior fellow at Renaissance Philanthropy in April 2026. After graduating from Berkeley, he served as a program director and senior advisor to the United States' ARPA-E and later founded two startup companies.

== Education ==
Gur obtained his PhD from the University of California, Berkeley in Materials Science and Engineering.

== Career ==
Gur served as a Program Director and Senior Adviser for ARPA-E between 2011 and 2014. He has founded two science-based startups, including Seeo Inc., which was acquired by Bosch in 2015.

Gur was the founder and former CEO of Activate, an innovation non-profit that uses an entrepreneurial fellowship model to help scientists and engineers transform their research into products and businesses. Activate's fellowship model originated at Cyclotron Road, a Division of Lawrence Berkeley National Lab, founded by Gur in 2014.

In July 2022, Gur was appointed as the inaugural CEO of the Advanced Research and Invention Agency(ARIA), a non-departmental public body legally mandated in British law under the Advanced Research and Invention Agency Act 2022. He took a £455,000 annual salary to ensure that ARIA's annual budget funded projects that benefited the United Kingdom's economy.

Speaking to the parliamentary select committee in 2025 Gur stated, "One is that there is a lot of intention from Parliament. ARIA was not given a very narrow mission mandate. Our mission broadly is to unlock science and technology breakthroughs that can benefit everyone. That is how we view it. It is a global ambition, but obviously a dedication to benefiting the future of the UK."

Between 2023 and 2025, ARIA used one-eighth of its £400 million annual budget to fund organisations based in the United States. These included Venture Café and Renaissance Philanthropy

Gur announced in June 2025 that he was leaving his position at ARIA. In November 2025 Kathleen Fisher was appointed as his successor. She took over in February 2026 and Gur returned to the United States.

Gur became a senior fellow at Renaissance Philanthropy in April, 2026.
