= EuroStack =

European digital policy initiative

- Products: Digital Infrastructure
- Location: EU
- Founder: Sebastiano Toffaletti, Cristina Caffarra
- Key people: Francesca Bria, Cecilia Rikap, Andrea Renda
- Established: 2024
- Status: proposal
- Website: Multiple initiatives: www.euro-stack.info; www.eurostack.eu

EuroStack is a set of initiatives of academics, politicians, commentators and industry players aimed at building an independent European digital infrastructure to limit the dependence of the European Union on foreign technology and US companies.

== Background ==
The concept of a "European Stack" to describe a pan-European project of sovereign technical infrastructure was first proposed by media theorist McKenzie Wark in 2019, while the specific term "EuroStack" was coined by Glen Weyl in 2024. Initial advocates for the EuroStack initiative stated that 80% of European technology is imported, which creates a dependency on US and Chinese technology. Bria and Timmers's version of the initiative calls to mobilize €300 billion over 10 years to invest in European technological independence. Advocates of EuroStack have repeatedly referred to the risk of the EU becoming a digital colony.

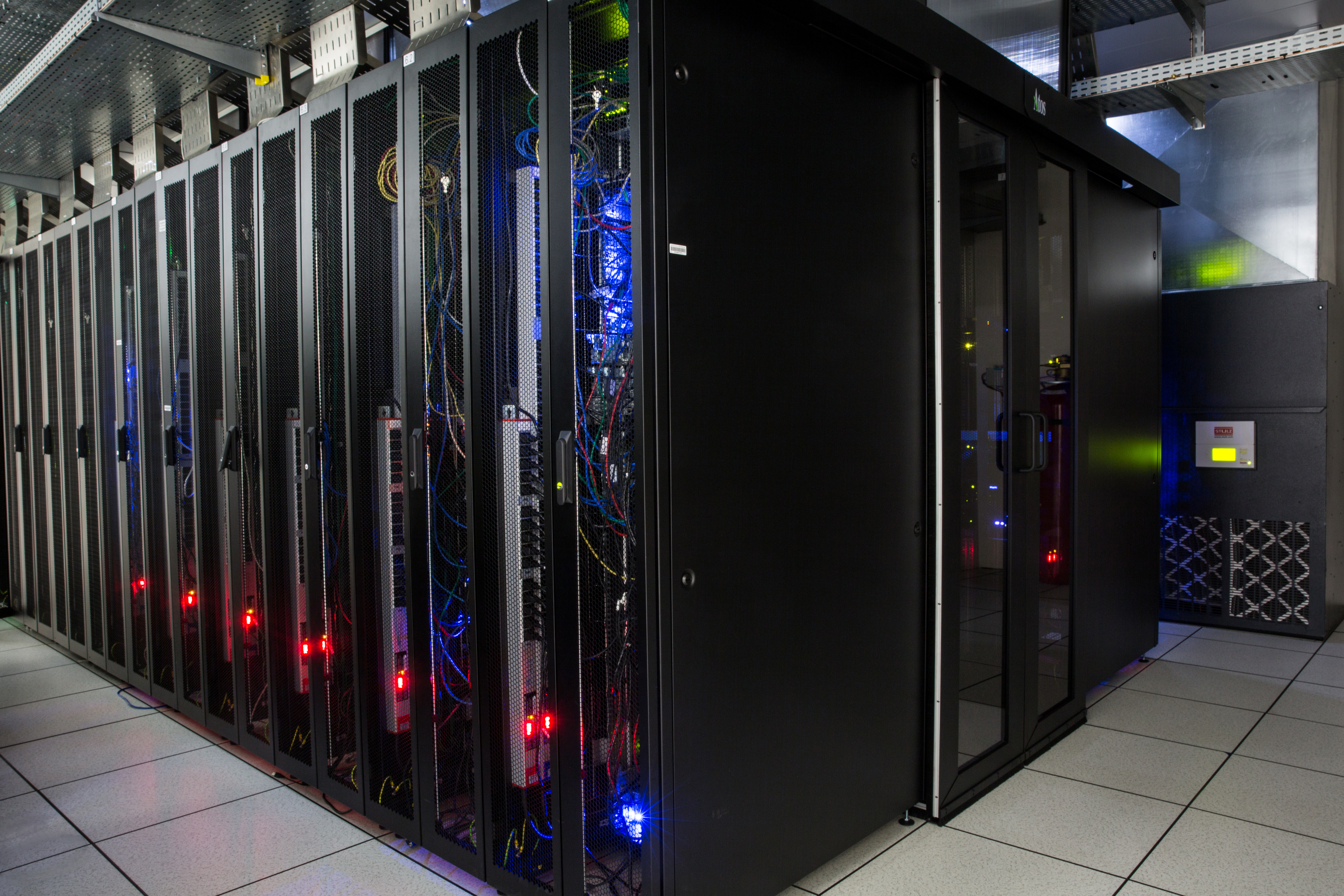
Datacenter at a European university (Ecole Polytechnique)

Cecilia Rikap and Aline Blankertz warned against the protectionist undertone of the initiative to break away from US tech dependency. Rikap and Blankertz recognize the threat to democracy that the dependency on US tech represents. They argue for a measured approach of investing in core technologies, in particular cloud services, instead of writing large checks to subsidize aspirational national champions. European public procurement, would be one important strand in a EuroStack strategy according to the two economists.

== History ==
The EuroStack discussion was initiated in September 2024 at a conference organized by Cristina Caffarra, Francesca Bria and Meredith Whittaker and hosted by the European Parliament in Brussels.

On 10 January 2025, a group of industry experts including Caffarra published the first “EuroStack” pitch, arguing a case for the initiative. Over 80 organisations signed the letter.

In February 2025, a group of academics, jointly with the Bertelsmann Stiftung and CEPS launched a separate initiative. The academics group included Francesca Bria and Paul Timmers. In June 2025, their proposal received the support of the European Parliament's ITRE Committee. In their commentary in Foreign Policy around the same time, Francesca Bria and Haroon Sheikh presented the EuroStack as Europe's last chance to preserve its sovereignty in the digital age.

=== Trademark litigation ===
In 2025, Sebastiano Toffaletti (Secretary General of European Digital SME Alliance) and Cristina Caffarra, a former paid advisor of TikTok's parent company ByteDance, began legal proceedings over the right to use the name EuroStack. This is important because one of the stated objectives of Eurostack is to reduce dependence on both the US and China. Toffaletti filed a claim first with the European Union Intellectual Property Office, that Caffarra contested on the grounds that "Toffaletti could not apply for the trademark as the Eurostack term is already "used in the course of trade". Caffarra was initially associated with the public initiative together with Francesca Bria. The spat between Caffarra and other participants led to confusion among commentators as to which initiative is rightly referred to as EuroStack.

== See also ==
- Strategic autonomy
- GAIA-X
- Trade and Technology Council
