= Bel Pesce =

Brazilian writer and entrepreneur

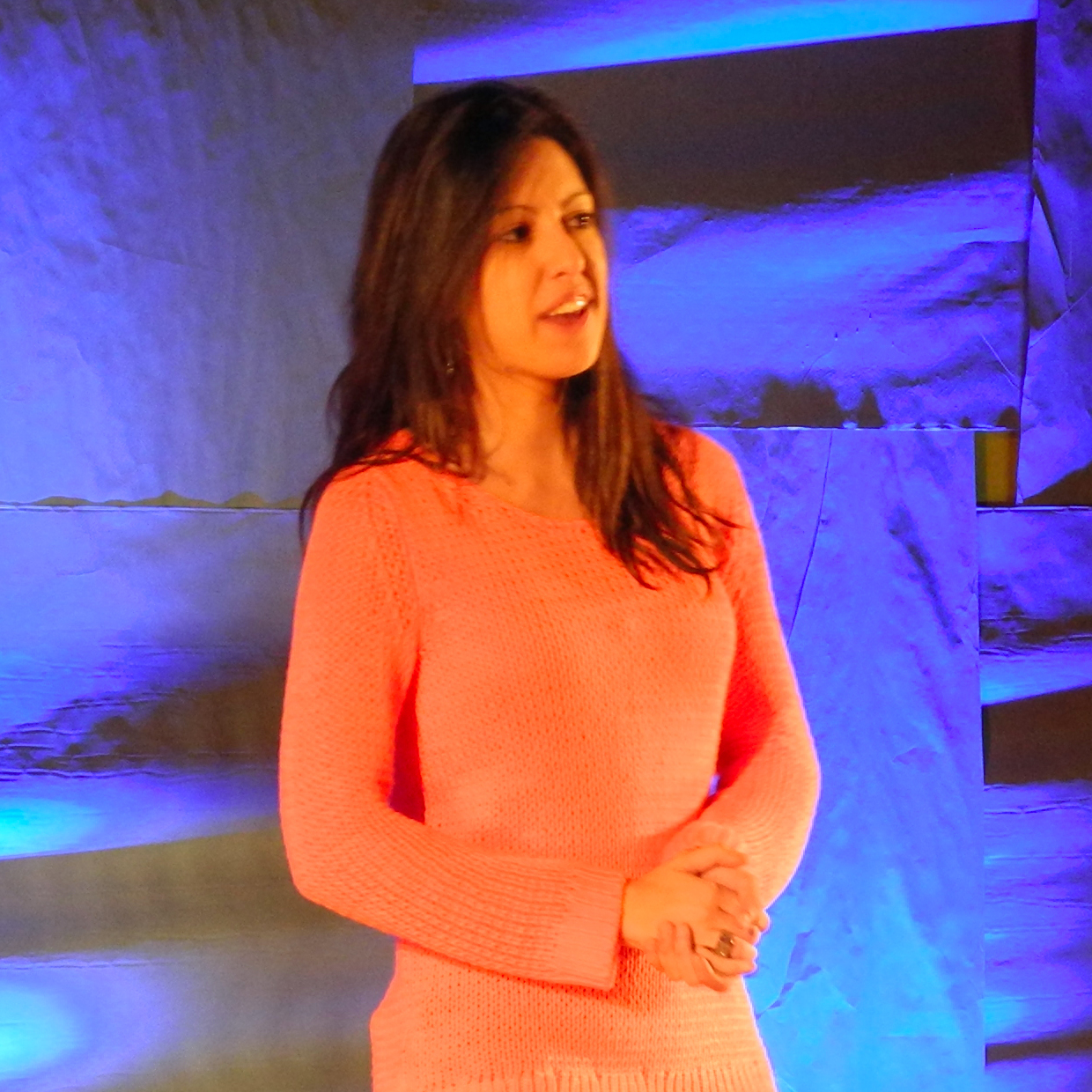
Bel Pesce, 2013

Isabel Pesce Mattos (born 20 February 1988), better known as Bel Pesce, is a Brazilian entrepreneur, best known as a writer and lecturer. She is sometimes referred to as "Menina do Vale do Silício" (the "Girl from Silicon Valley").

== Biography ==
Pesce was born in São Paulo, and studied at MIT, where she obtained degrees in Electrical Engineering / Computer Science and Management Science. Claims that she had plus three degrees have been disproved. During her studies she worked as a summer intern for Microsoft, Google and Deutsche Bank. Despite being named among the 100 most influential people in Brazil by Epoca magazine, her credentials have been questioned, and claims that she founded the video platform Ooyala and the app Lemon Wallet have been disproved. Her major critics included the YouTubers Izzy Nobre and Felipe Neto.

Pesce was a product manager at Ooyala in its early days and was later head of business development at Lemon. In 2012, she released a free e-book called A Menina do Vale (The Girl from the Valley), which launched her career as an inspirational speaker and writer and a TED fellow. In 2013, she founded the company FazINOVA, which "teaches professional and personal development through entrepreneurial values", and founded the BeDream app. On the strength of these achievements, she was named the 2014 Laureate for Latin America in the Cartier Women's Initiative Awards. In 2015 she was one of the BBC's 100 Women.

== Recognition ==
She was recognized as one of the BBC's 100 women in 2015.

== Resume authenticity ==
After these controversies, several doubts began to arise regarding the veracity of the information provided by her. On her page, Pesce claims to have 5 degrees from MIT (Electrical Engineering, Computer Science, Administration, Economics and Mathematics). However, three of these degrees were questioned. It was also revealed that her stints at Microsoft and Google were merely “short internships facilitated by an MIT program that sends students to work at large companies” without much importance. These websites also criticized the content of her lectures on entrepreneurship, which they described as “empty self-help lectures” or “stage entrepreneurship”, claiming that she inflated her resume in order to attract investors and fans. She later presented some documents that showed that her resume did not really match what she claimed in interviews. One of the main exponents of Bel Pesce's controversies was the Brazilian digital influencer Izzy Nobre, who organized the findings of all the investigations on his website, "Hoje é um Bom Dia".
