= Focused Research Organisation =

Time-limited non-profit research organizations that build scientific infrastructure

A focused research organization (FRO) is a type of time-limited, mission-driven non-profit research organization that sets out to build a specific tool, dataset or other piece of scientific infrastructure that universities, companies and government laboratories are poorly placed to produce. Proponents describe FROs as projects that are too large and too coordinated for an academic laboratory and not immediately profitable enough for a company, so that they fall between the existing institutions. The concept was proposed in 2020 by Adam Marblestone and Samuel Rodriques, and the first FROs were launched from 2021 by the non-profit Convergent Research.

== Concept ==
FROs are intended to produce what their advocates call public goods for science: tools, datasets and methods that speed up research in a field but that are neither commercially attractive nor easily published as academic papers. Marblestone and his colleagues describe an FRO as a non-profit start-up with a single, well-defined goal such as improving a measurement technology by an order of magnitude or gathering a pre-specified amount of data, organized around quantifiable technical milestones. The model is distinct from conventional grant-funded research, in which individual investigators propose projects and are rewarded mainly for publications.

According to Convergent Research's founders, a typical FRO has an integrated team of 10 to 30 full-time staff, around $20 million to $50 million of investment and a lifespan of three to seven years, and is not meant to replace universities, companies or government laboratories. When a FRO nears the end of its funding, the founders describe several possible outcomes: release of open-source data or reagents, partnerships with existing institutions, spin-out as a start-up or a longer-lived non-profit, or integration into a larger project.

== History ==
The idea emerged from discussions among researchers, most of them working on brain mapping, in the laboratory of Ed Boyden at the Massachusetts Institute of Technology. Marblestone, Andrew Payne and Rodriques, then researchers or doctoral students there, were among those involved, and Rodriques described the concept in the final chapter of his 2019 doctoral thesis. Large coordinated projects such as the Human Genome Project, the Large Hadron Collider and the Hubble Space Telescope were cited as inspirations. In 2020, while fellows at the Federation of American Scientists (FAS), Marblestone and Rodriques published a policy memorandum urging the next US administration to fund FROs, and Marblestone, working with Tom Kalil, interviewed scientists in many fields and found that the funding gap extended beyond neuroscience.

Convergent Research was announced on October 12, 2021, as the first initiative of the Schmidt Futures Network, with the aim of identifying research opportunities and launching them as FROs. Marblestone, Kalil and Anastasia Gamick are named as its founders. In January 2022 Marblestone, Gamick, Kalil, Cheryl Martin, Milan Cvitkovic and Rodriques set out the model in a comment article in Nature. By mid-2025 Convergent had supported ten FROs, and its founders wrote in the autumn of that year that they had made "almost a dozen" launches.

== Examples ==
Organization	Area	Reported aim or output
E11 Bio	Neuroscience	Imaging tools to map the wiring of the brain, with a stated aim of cutting the cost of mapping a hundredfold; its PRISM method had mapped part of the mouse hippocampus by 2025.
Cultivarium	Synthetic biology	Making microorganisms easier to use in synthetic biology; released software that predicts growth conditions for microbes from their genomes.
[C]Worthy	Climate	Tools for ensuring that ocean-based carbon dioxide removal is safe; released an interactive map of alkalinity activity.
Lean FRO	Mathematics and software	Development of the Lean programming language and proof assistant, which Google DeepMind used to reach silver-medal level on International Mathematical Olympiad problems.
Forest Neurotech	Neurotechnology	Minimally invasive brain–computer interfaces.
Parallel Squared Technology Institute	Proteomics	Methods to run nearly 30 times more samples in parallel.
OpenImmune Foundation	Immunology	Open dataset and computational models for predicting immune reactions to biologic medicines; announced in November 2026 as receiving £5 million of UK Government funding.

Marblestone described the use of Lean by DeepMind as the first concrete evidence that FROs are effective.

== Government and policy interest ==
=== United States ===
The 2020 FAS memorandum argued that the US government should fund FROs directly. In 2026 the National Science Foundation was reported to be running an "X-Labs" program, funded from its Technology, Innovation and Partnerships directorate under Other Transaction Authority, offering up to $1.5 billion in milestone-structured funding to independent research organizations; an FAS commentary described it as building on early results from FROs and from other philanthropically supported independent laboratories.

=== United Kingdom ===
Bind Research, which works on disordered proteins as drug targets, was described by the UK government as the country's first FRO; the Department for Science, Innovation and Technology committed £12.9 million, matched by £12.9 million of non-public co-investment, through its Research Ventures Catalyst program. In 2022 a report published jointly by The Entrepreneurs Network and Convergent Research argued that the United Kingdom had particular opportunities to use the model in biomedicine and net-zero technologies. In April 2026 the Advanced Research and Invention Agency (ARIA) and Convergent Research launched two further UK FROs, Meridial and Echo Labs, through a UK FRO Founder Residency that ARIA described as a first pilot. In November 2026 the UK Government's Sovereign AI unit announced £5 million of non-equity funding from its Strategic Assets Programme for OpenImmune Foundation, which it described as a UK-led, not-for-profit FRO.

== Challenges and criticism ==
The model is recent, and assessment so far has come largely from those involved in creating it. An MIT news article in 2025 reported that most FROs were still at an early stage and that their founders expected success to be judged over roughly ten years, by spin-outs, partnerships and durable initiatives as well as by the tools produced.

Convergent's founders have themselves reported difficulties. They said that recruitment was easier than they had feared but that FROs struggled to match large technology companies on pay for senior roles; that mid-project fundraising was hard, so budgets needed to be secured early; that rigid milestones had given way to adaptive goals revised several times a year; and that producing a working tool is not enough without an active user base.

On government funding, Pierre Azoulay of MIT has argued in Science for skepticism that public money is the right way to scale independent laboratories, according to an FAS commentary, which also noted other concerns, including public accountability given the operational independence of such programs and claims that funding was being diverted from academic research, a perception the commentary's author called inaccurate.

== See also ==
- DARPA
- Advanced Research and Invention Agency
- Janelia Research Campus
- Self-driving laboratory
- Open science
