= Amali de Alwis =

English businesswoman

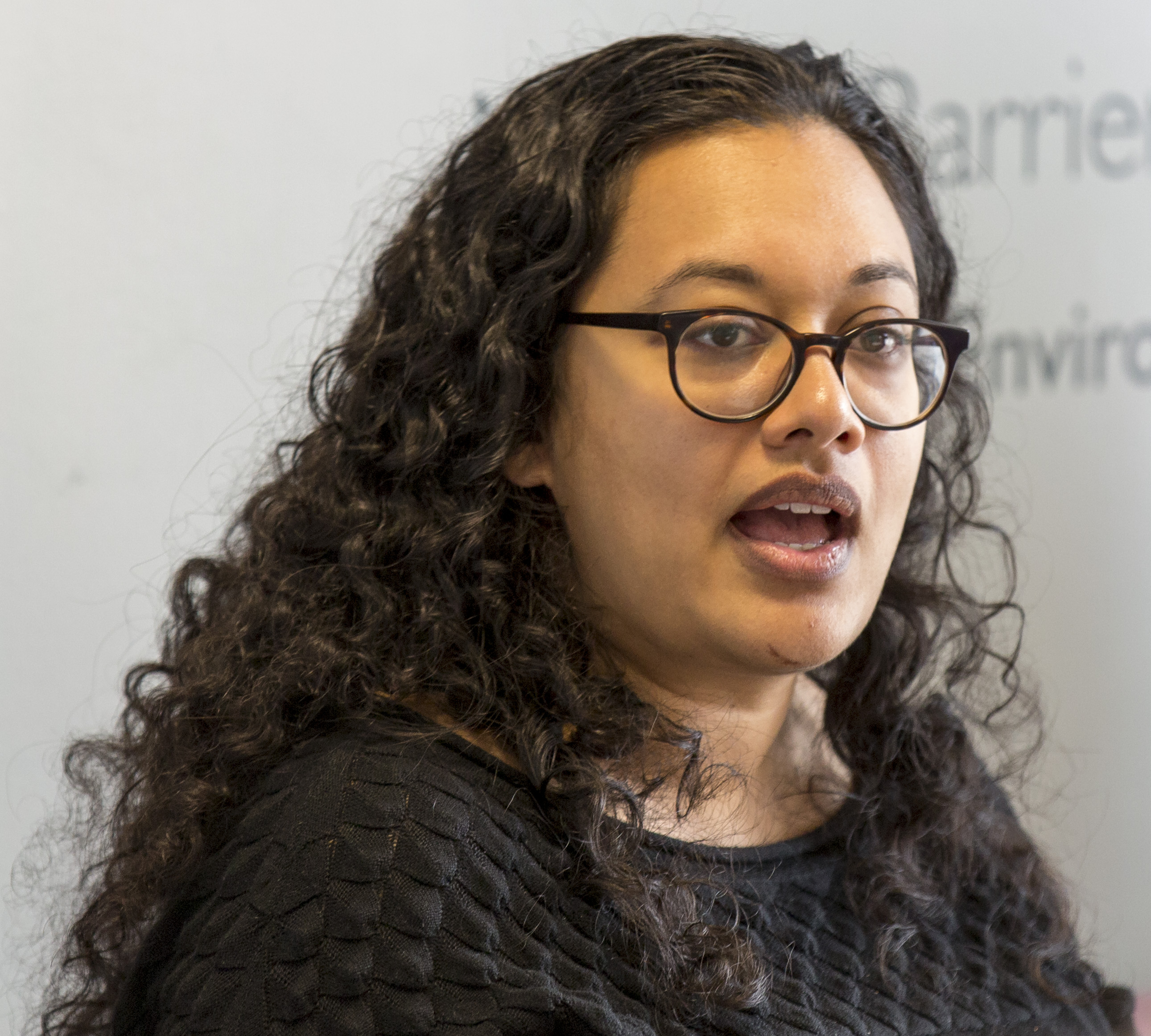
- Amali de Alwis visits Government Digital Service in 2016
- Born: April 1980 (age 46)
- Education: Camberwell College of Arts; University of the Arts London; University of Birmingham
- Employer: Code First: Girls
- Awards: MBE (18)

Amali Chivanthi de Alwis (born April 1980) MBE FRSA was the CEO of Code First: Girls. Replaced by Anna Brailsford. She previously served as UK Managing Director of Microsoft for Startups. She is a board member of Ada, the National College for Digital Skills, and the Institute of Coding.

== Early life and education ==
De Alwis attended Nonsuch High School for Girls and graduated in 1998. She studied manufacturing engineering at the University of Birmingham. In 2002 she completed a foundation course at Camberwell College of Arts, before studying product development at the University of the Arts London. She enrolled in the graduate program at Clarks Shoes, which she left to become a consultant at Kantar TNS. At TNS Alwis advised organisations on stakeholder management and digital strategies.

== Career ==
De Alwis spent two years at Kantar TNS before joining PricewaterhouseCoopers as a thought leadership manager. During her time at PricewaterhouseCoopers she took a secondment to the World Economic Forum. She delivered a report on resilience and risk, and the correlation between operational performance and societal value. She worked at Startup Direct as a mentor, advising London and Birmingham based start-up businesses. She started working with Entrepreneur First in 2015 and has worked simultaneously worked as a commissioner for the Doncaster Education and Skills Commission. De Alwis has written for The Daily Telegraph the Evening Standard and The Times, and is Chair of the BIMA Diversity Council. De Alwis is a mentor for June Angelides, an employee of Silicon Valley Bank who launched the start-up Mums in Technology. She has been part of Debating Matters.

=== Code First: Girls ===
De Alwis has spoken extensively about the need for more women in technology and the lack of computer science teachers in school education. She joined Code First: Girls in 2015. Under her leadership, Code First: Girls has taught more UK women to code than the British university system, providing £2.5 million worth of free technology education. She has described Stephanie Shirley as one of her role models. She launched a campaign in December 2018 to teach 20,000 women to code for free by the end of 2020. The program will need £1.5 million funding, and is supported by Martha Lane Fox. De Alwis is a board member of Ada, the National College for Digital Skills and the Institute of Coding.

=== Awards and honours ===
She has been recognised the WISE Campaign for her "significant impact in encouraging girls to code". She won the 2017 Women in IT award for her services to electronic skills. She was selected as Computer Weekly's Most Influential Women in IT in 2018, after being in the top ten in 2017. She was awarded an MBE in the 2018 New Year Honours for services to diversity in technology.
