= Looking for Growth =

British political campaign group

- Abbreviation: LFG
- Formation: 2024; 2 years ago
- Website: lookingforgrowth.uk

Looking for Growth (LFG) is a British political campaign group founded in 2024. It has been described in UK media as a pro-growth, "anti-decline" movement combining policy advocacy with campaign actions and events.

== History ==
In January 2025, The Times reported on the group's proposals aimed at speeding up major infrastructure delivery, including changes related to planning and legal processes affecting major projects.

In June 2025, The Times and the London Standard reported on LFG's graffiti-removal activity on the London Underground as part of its broader campaigning. In the same period, PoliticsHome described the group as organising events and building local chapters, and reported that it planned a hackathon in late June 2025 for participants to develop tools and present them to judges and potential investors.

In a June 2025 interview, LFG co-founder Lawrence Newport used the term "vegetable lobby" to refer to environmental activists opposing some development proposals. Media coverage has also described LFG as seeking cross-party support for a pro-growth agenda and hosting events with speakers from more than one political party.

On 23 October 2025, LFG held an event titled Make or Break at indigo at The O2 in London; the venue listing advertised speakers including Dominic Cummings, Matt Clifford, Chris Curtis MP, and Katie Lam MP. A City AM column described the event as attracting "over 1,000 people".

== Reception ==
A City AM comment piece described Looking for Growth as an "energetic and optimistic" pro-growth movement and highlighted its ability to draw a large audience to its October 2025 event at The O2.

A MoneyWeek feature described Looking for Growth as a grassroots organisation of "founders, professionals and tradespeople" pushing for pro-growth policies.

A Guardian comment article criticised the group's emphasis on visible quality-of-life issues such as graffiti, arguing that this can distract from deeper structural causes of decline.

== See also ==
- YIMBY
- Planning in the United Kingdom
