= Robert Maynard Jr. =

American businessman (born 1962)

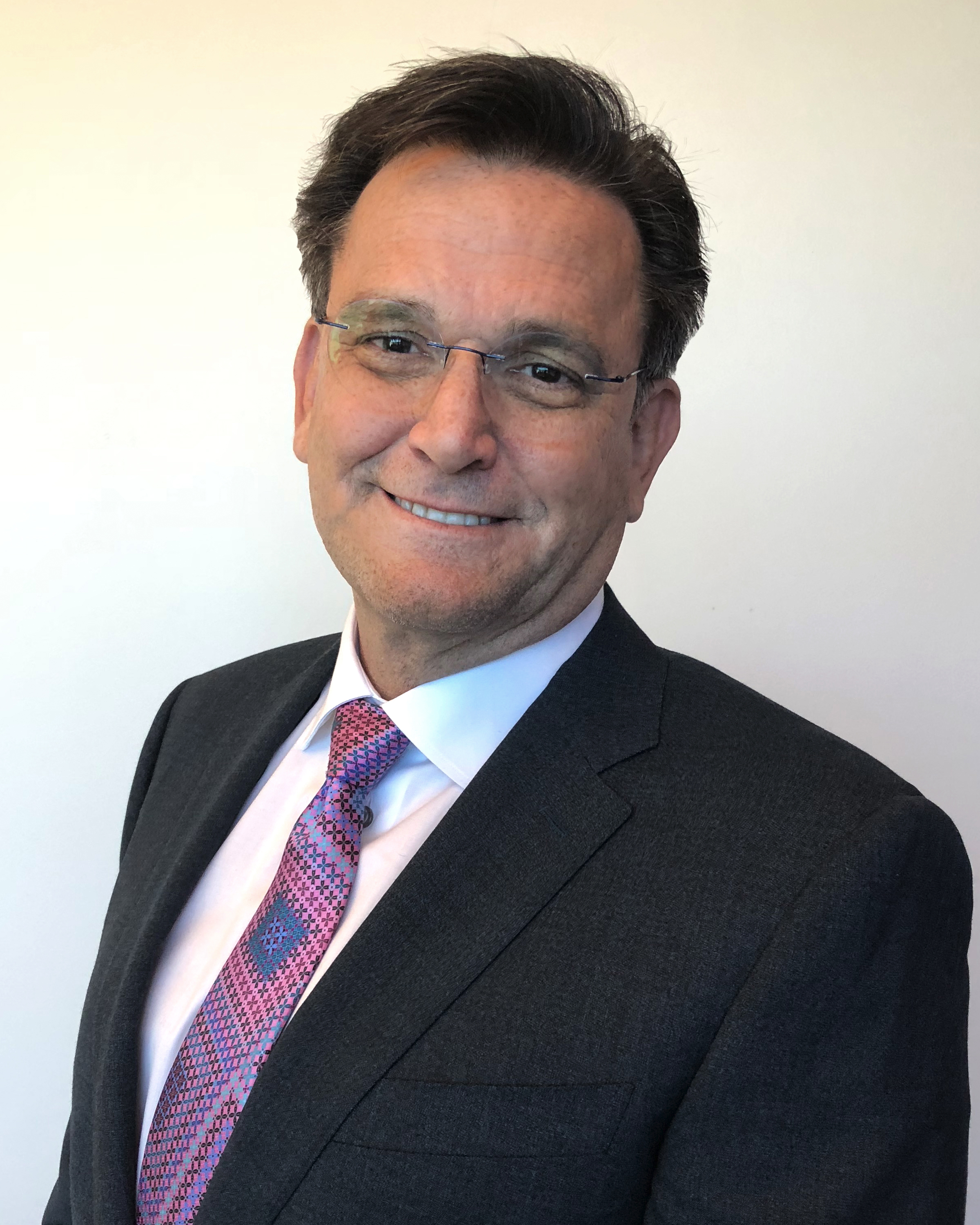
- Maynard in 2018
- Born: January 23, 1962 (age 64); Phoenix, Arizona, U.S.
- Education: Northern Arizona University (BA)
- Occupation: Businessman
- Years active: 1990s–present
- Known for: Co-Founder of LifeLock; Founder of Internet America & SurchX

Robert Maynard Jr. (born 1962) is an American businessman and co-founder of Internet America and LifeLock. He resigned from LifeLock in 2007 following reports that challenged the company's founding narrative and revealed his earlier ban from the credit repair industry by the Federal Trade Commission.

== Early life ==
Maynard was born and raised in Phoenix, Arizona. His father, Robert Maynard Sr., worked as an optometrist.

Maynard attended Northern Arizona University. He later served in the U.S. Marine Corps and as an officer in the U.S Army, including in the 12th Special Forces Group.

== Career ==
In the late 1990s, Maynard co-founded the Internet service provider Internet America. The company went public in 1998.

After departing from Internet America, Maynard founded Dotsafe, an internet filtering provider for educational sites. In 2005, he co-founded LifeLock with Todd Davis, an identity theft protection software company. He resigned in June 2007 following media criticism of his past involving bankruptcy, an FTC investigation, and identity theft.

== Personal life ==
After being diagnosed with bipolar disorder in his 40s, Maynard has spoken publicly about the diagnosis and his treatment experiences. He has written and spoken about mental health awareness. In 2020, Maynard published a book titled One F*cked Up Dude: My Continuing Journey to UnF*cked, addressing his diagnosis and how it has affected his career.

== See also ==
- FICO
- Todd Davis
