= Thomas Kalil =

American government official (born 1963)

Tom Kalil
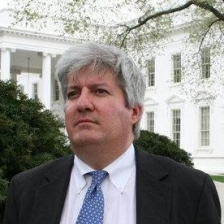
- Kalil c. 2013

Personal details
- Born: Thomas Amadeus Kalil; October 4, 1963 (age 62)
- Political party: Democratic
- Education: University of Wisconsin, Madison (BA); Tufts University

Thomas Amadeus Kalil (born October 4, 1963) is an expert on technology and innovation policy. In May 2024, he founded and became the CEO of Renaissance Philanthropy. He was previously the chief innovation officer at Schmidt Futures. He was the deputy director for policy in the White House Office of Science and Technology Policy under President Obama, and was also the senior advisor for science, technology and innovation for the United States National Economic Council.

== Career ==
Kalil is the son of Ronald and Katherine Kalil, both professors at the University of Wisconsin School of Medicine and Public Health in Madison. He earned a bachelor's degree in political science and international economics from the University of Wisconsin at Madison. Kalil completed graduate work at the Fletcher School of Law and Diplomacy. Kalil worked in the issues departments on two Democratic presidential campaigns, 1988 and 1992. His work included writing position papers and briefing the candidate on a wide range of policy issues, experiences he later described as being "like boot camp for policy wonks."

Before entering government, Kalil was a trade specialist at the Washington offices of Dewey Ballantine. There, he represented the Semiconductor Industry Association (SIA) on technology policy and U.S.-Japan trade issues. In this capacity he was principal staffer to Gordon Moore, then chair of the SIA Technology Committee.

During the Clinton administration, Kalil was deputy assistant to the president for technology and economic policy, and, simultaneously, deputy director of the White House National Economic Council. As such, he worked on a range of technology and telecommunications issues, including the liberalization of export controls, the allocation of wireless spectrum, and high-tech workforce issues. Kalil provided leadership for a number of White House initiatives, including the National Nanotechnology Initiative, the Next Generation Internet, and several others. He advocated for increased support for the physical sciences and engineering during a time when they were perceived to be neglected as compared to the life sciences and biomedical research.

Leaving government at the end of the Clinton administration, Kalil became a senior fellow with the Center for American Progress, and later special assistant to the chancellor for science and technology at the University of California, Berkeley. There, he developed multi-disciplinary research initiatives, most of them at the interfaces among information technology, nanotechnology, and biology. He served on several committees of the National Academy of Sciences. From 2007–2008, Kalil chaired the Clinton Global Initiative's Global Health Working Group. That group developed new initiatives in areas including under-nutrition, maternal and child health, and vaccines.

Kalil joined the Obama administration in 2009.

Kalil was the chief innovation officer at Schmidt Futures from 2017 to 2024.

Kalil is now the CEO of Renaissance Philanthropy.

In 1995 Kalil married MaryAnne McCormick, a former legislative aide to Senator Daniel P. Moynihan. McCormick was, at the time, a lobbyist for Corning Inc. and was later an attorney at the Federal Communications Commission. He is the brother of behavioral economist Ariel Kalil.
