= Wences Casares =

Argentine businessman

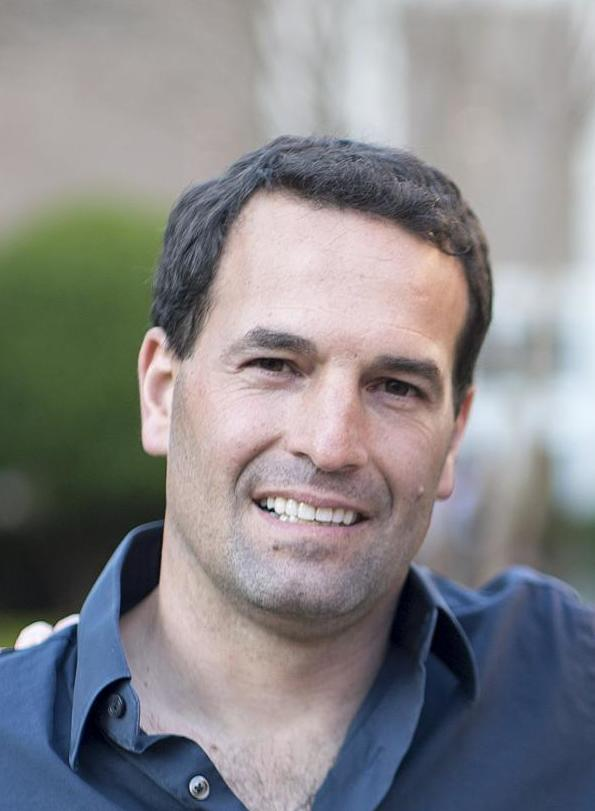
- Casares in 2022
- Born: Wenceslao Casares; 26 February 1974 (age 52); Gobernador Costa, Chubut, Patagonia, Argentina
- Education: Harvard University, University of San Andrés
- Occupation: Founder of Xapo

Wences Casares (born 26 February 1974) is a Silicon Valley–based fintech entrepreneur. He is the founder of Xapo Bank, and also founded Internet Argentina, Wanako Games, Patagon, Bling Nation, Lemon Wallet, and Banco Lemon. Casares sat on the boards of PayPal and Diem.

== Early life ==
Casares is the eldest of four from a family of sheep ranchers in Patagonia, Argentina. In high school, Casares earned a Rotary Club scholarship as an exchange student in Washington, Pennsylvania. He returned to Buenos Aires to study business administration for three years at the University of San Andrés and dropped out to launch Argentina's first Internet service provider, Internet Argentina S.A. in 1994.

He exited the company and then founded Argentine online brokerage, Patagon, in 1997. Patagon established itself as Latin America's leading comprehensive Internet financial services portal and expanded its online banking services to the United States, Spain, and Germany. Patagon was acquired by the Spanish bank, Banco Santander for $750 million and became Santander Online worldwide. Investors in Patagon included George Soros, Jorge Paulo Leman, Stephan Schmidheiny, Intel, Microsoft, JPMorgan Chase, and entrepreneur Fred Wilson.

== Career ==
In 2002, Casares founded Wanako Games (later Behaviour Santiago), a videogame developer headquartered in New York City. Wanako Games was best known for the blockbuster game Assault Heroes and was acquired by Activision in 2007. In 2002, Casares founded Banco Lemon, a bank based in Brazil, which was acquired by Banco do Brasil in 2009.

Casares was the founder and CEO of Lemon Wallet, a digital wallet platform. In 2013 the American firm LifeLock bought Lemon for about $43 million (US).

=== Xapo ===
Casares is the founder of Xapo Bank, a UK-based private bank for Bitcoin whales worldwide. Xapo is said to be the largest custodian of bitcoin in the world and is believed to hold as much as $10 billion of the cryptocurrency in underground vaults on five continents, including in a former Swiss military bunker. Xapo has raised $40 million from leading Silicon Valley venture capital firms. Widely known as "Patient Zero", Quartz reported that Casares was the entrepreneur to convince Bill Gates, Reid Hoffman, Chamath Palihapitiya, Bill Miller, Mike Novogratz, Pete Briger and other tech veterans in Silicon Valley and Wall Street to invest in bitcoin.

== Philanthropy ==
He is an elected member of the World Economic Forum's "Young Global Leaders" Class of 2011 and regularly attends the World Economic Forum Annual Meeting in Davos, Switzerland. In 2010 Casares partnered with Pablo Bosch to found Las Majadas de Pirque, a social capital and innovation facility owned by Casares in Santiago, Chile. He is a member of the 2017 Class of Henry Crown Fellows in the Aspen Global Leadership Network at the Aspen Institute and he is a member of the Young Presidents' Organization. He was formerly a board member at Kiva and Endeavor.
