= Aline Blankertz =

German data economist

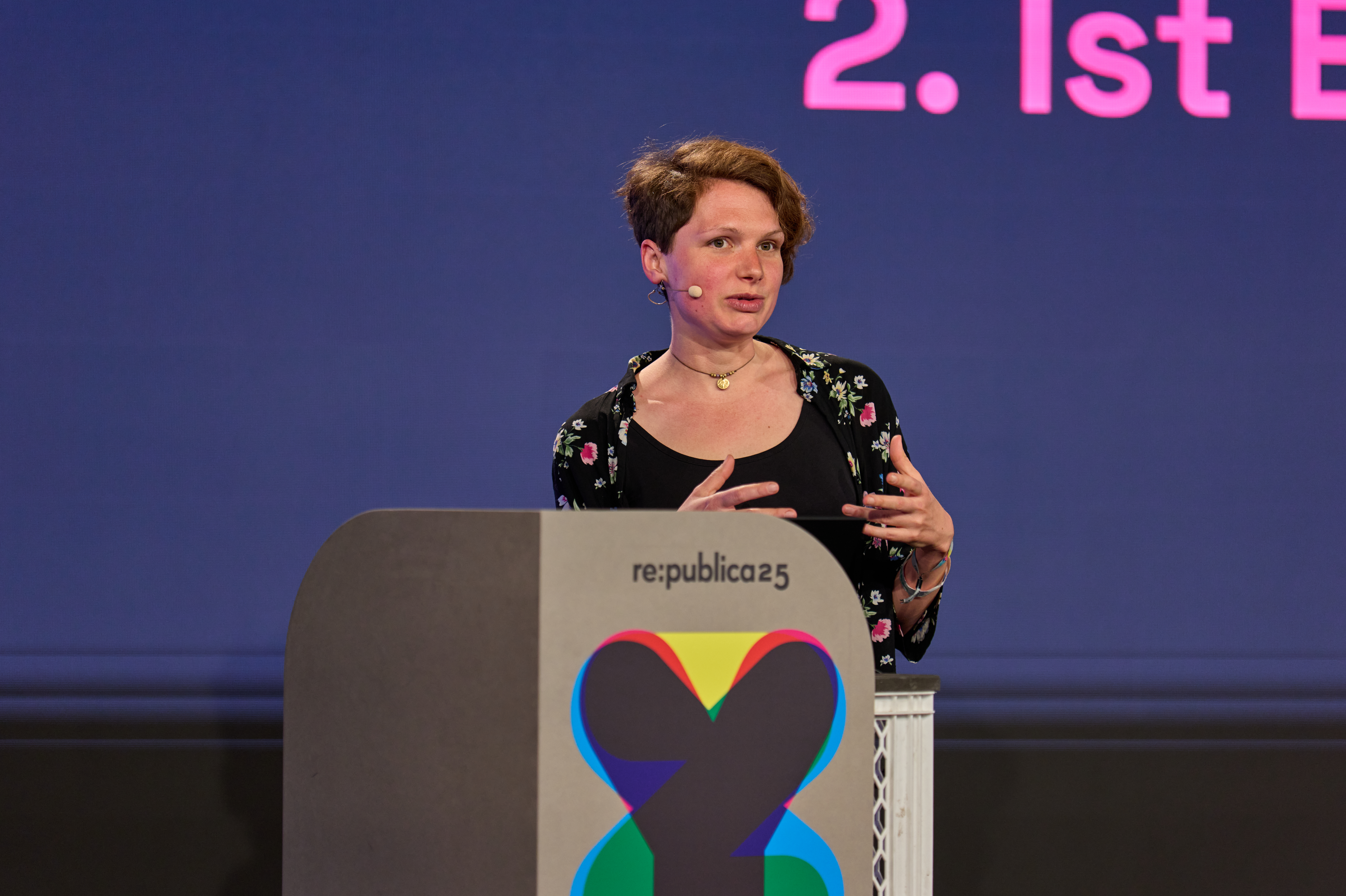
- Aline Blankertz at the re:publica 25 in Berlin
- Born: 1987 or 1988 (age 37–38)
- Education: University of Münster, University of St. Gallen
- Occupation: data economist
- Employers: Oxera (2013-2019);(2021-2022); Stiftung Neue Verantwortung (2019-2021); Wikimedia (2022-2025); Rebalance Now (2025-current)
- Known for: Competition (economics); Antimonopoly

Aline Blankertz is a German data economist and digital rights campaigner.

== Education and career ==
Blankertz studied economics at the University of Münster and University of St. Gallen. As part of her curriculum, she also studied at Chulalongkorn University (in 2008), Oxford University (in 2010) and completed a MA in Finance at Universidad Torcuato di Tella in 2012. Blankertz practiced economics at the consultancy Oxera in Oxford and in Berlin for 7 years in total. She worked on questions of competition policy and market power. From 2019 until 2021, she was a project director at the think tank Stiftung Neue Verantwortung, based in Berlin. In 2022, Blankertz joined the non-profit organization Wikimedia Deutschland. She subsequently moved to work for the German non-profit organization Rebalance Now on antimonopoly advocacy.

== Digital rights advocacy ==
Blankertz advocated for digital infrastructure for Europe that would provide alternatives to Amazon, Google and other US tech giants. According to Blankertz, breaking up Big Tech is necessary to make any alternative digital infrastructure possible. Subsidizing a European digital platform will not suffice to counter the economic and political power of large gatekeepers in the digital economy. Blankertz is of the view that AI applications should prioritize the needs of people over corporate interests. Blankertz expressed support for public initiatives for alternatives to Big Tech but she also warned against ill-designed public projects to create digital infrastructure paid for by taxpayer money. Specifically, she expressed concerns about the EU’s Gaia-X project, aimed at competing against Amazon. Blankertz pointed out that such projects will not work if there is no demand for the subsidized cloud product. In the same vein, Blankertz called for caution regarding the European public cloud infrastructure project EuroStack. Independence from Big Tech is best achieved by strategically investing in some areas of the digital infrastructure where Europe can compete, not through adversarial protectionist policies and subsidies.

Regarding the 2020 TikTok controversy, in which the Trump administration accused the company of spying for the Chinese government, Blankertz pointed out that social media platforms receive access to sensitive personal data and that the potential misuse of this data is dangerous. Blankertz has also raised concerns regarding data protection in the US. In her view, the Trump administration's attacks on TikTok are a form of digital protectionism. In 2025, Blankertz expressed concern about TikTok relying on AI for content moderation in Germany and laying off people. Content moderation requires local knowledge to be effective according to the economist. Blankertz is a frequent commentator on the EuroStack initiative to set up a European cloud infrastructure and to cut dependency on US Big Tech.

== Advising lawmakers ==
Blankertz intervened in the German parliament as an expert on digital matters. She also provided trainings on economics to European judges.

Blankertz argued for a more friendly legal framework and quicker reform in Germany to allow data exchange, in order to boost the competitiveness of the German industry through rapid AI adoption.

== Personal life ==
Blankertz lives in Berlin and is a mother of two children.
