= Xapo Bank =

Private bank

Xapo Bank Limited
- Headquarters: {{{location_country}}}
- Area served: Worldwide, excluding U.S.
- Creator: Wences Casares
- Chairperson: Wences Casares
- CEO: Seamus Rocca
- Industry: Financial services
- Products: debit cards, Bitcoin account USD account
- Services: Asset protection, investment, interest payout
- Website: xapobank.com
- Launched: March 2014

Xapo Bank is a private bank headquartered in Gibraltar, which operates globally and is licensed as a virtual asset currency provider by the Gibraltar Financial Services Commission. As of 2023, the company offers stock market trading to its clients in Europe.

== History ==
Xapo Bank's founding CEO and entrepreneur Wences Casares became interested in bitcoin because of the frequent financial fluctuations in his native Argentina. He has said that his family's finances were "devastated as the economy (in Argentina) rocketed from inflation to deflation to devaluation." Casares believes that digital currencies such as bitcoin "could solve the disjointed nature of our world economy."

In 2011, Casares bought his first bitcoins but couldn't find a way to store them, so he built a 'vault' for his own use. Friends, and later financial institutions, soon asked Casares if they could store their bitcoins in his vault. This became the foundation for Xapo, which was founded in late 2013 by Casares and COO Federico Murrone. Xapo opened its products to the public in March 2014. Prior to Xapo Bank, Casares founded and later sold online brokerage firm Patagon to Banco Santander for $750 million. He also launched the first Internet provider in his home country of Argentina in 1994.

Casares said Xapo Bank was founded with the aim of making the bitcoin currency more secure and accessible. The company originally established to offer a bitcoin wallet service that combined cold storage vaults with a bitcoin-based debit card. The Xapo Wallet operates through a mobile app and online and includes the ability to transfer funds to and from the Xapo Vault. In April 2014, Xapo introduced a debit card that links to the user's Xapo Wallet and functions like a standard debit card, except that it is backed by bitcoins instead of traditional currency.

In May 2015 Xapo Bank moved its headquarters from Palo Alto, California to Zug, located in the Zurich metropolitan area of Switzerland. That year LifeLock, which acquired Lemon, a company led by eventual Xapo founder Casares, alleged in a suit that Casares developed the source code for Xapo using Lemon's resources. In July 2017, Xapo was granted a European e-money license in Gibraltar allowing it to provide electronic fiat money custodial and transfer services.

In July 2018 Xapo Bank was awarded a BitLicense by the New York State Department of Financial Services and with it formal approval to operate in the state of New York as a regulated Bitcoin business. The company relinquished its license in January 2022.

In 2019, Coinbase acquired Xapo Bank's institutional custody business.

As of 2023, Xapo Bank's app offered trading in blue chip stocks to its non-US members.

In August 2024, Xapo Bank expanded into the UK market, becoming the first in the country to offer interest-bearing Bitcoin and fiat banking accounts.

=== Security ===
The Xapo Bank Vault consists of physical servers located around the globe that the company says are protected by biometric scanner access, 24/7 video surveillance, and armed guards.

=== Investors ===
Xapo announced $20 million Series A funding in March 2014. The funding round was led by Benchmark, with participation from Fortress Investment Group, Pantera Capital, and Ribbit Capital. Benchmark partner Matt Cohler said the VC firm backed Xapo in part because Xapo “is led by one of the most important people in the bitcoin ecosystem, it’s insured and has investors from both Silicon Valley and Wall Street.” The company has raised a total of $40 million as of August 2014.

== See also ==
- Bitcoin
