= Alice Bentinck =

British entrepreneur (born 1986)

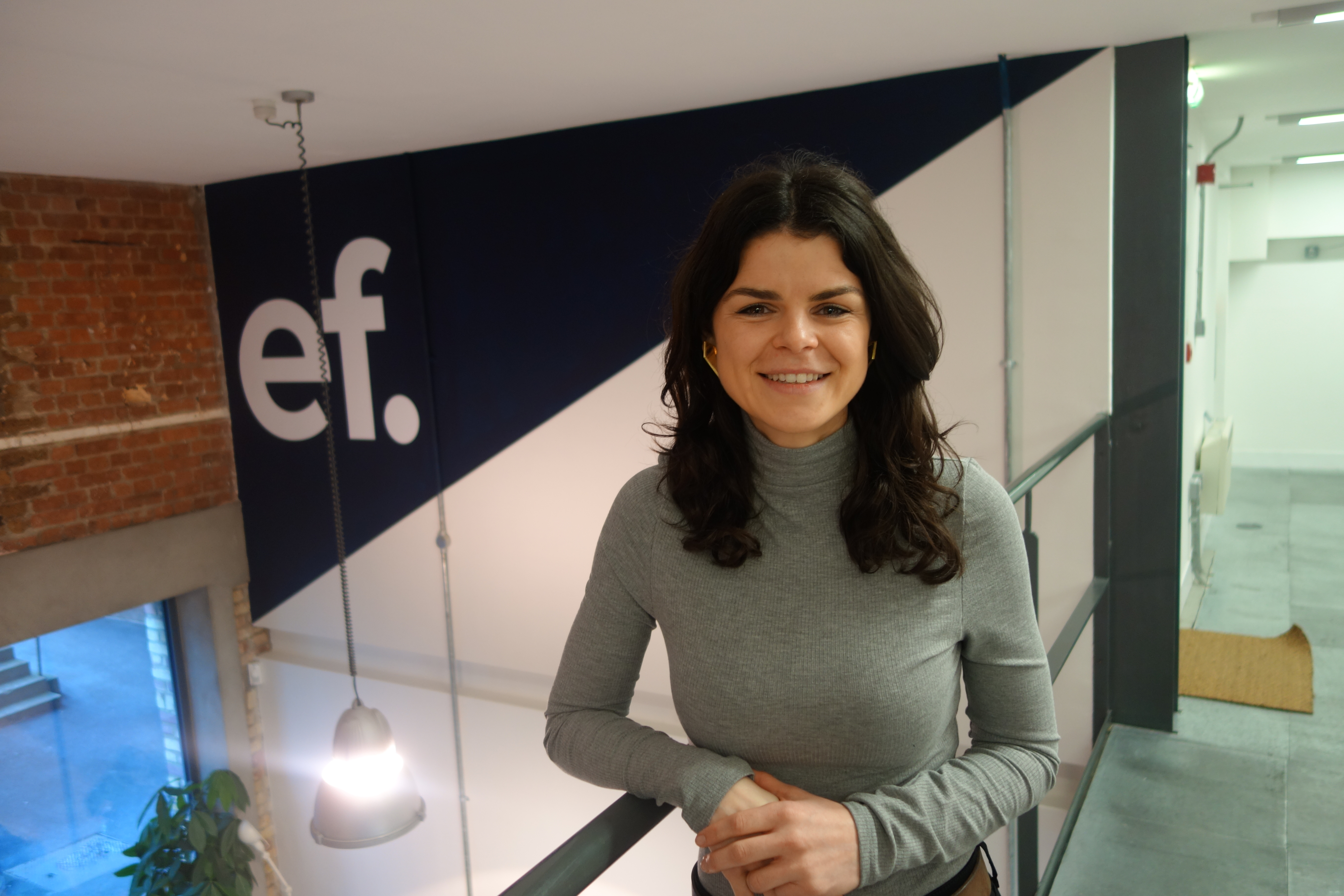
- Bentinck in 2016
- Born: 23 July 1986 (age 40); New Forest, England
- Occupation: Entrepreneur
- Years active: 2011–present
- Known for: CEO of Entrepreneur First; Co-founder of Code First: Girls

Alice Yvonne Bentinck MBE (born 23 July 1986) is a British entrepreneur. Along with Matt Clifford she is the co-founder of Entrepreneurs First (EF), a London-based company builder and startup accelerator founded in 2011. EF finds exceptional talent from around the world, and funds them to build exceptional companies. In 2017, it was announced that Reid Hoffman, co-founder of LinkedIn and Partner at Greylock, was leading a $12.4million investment into Entrepreneurs First.

Bentinck is a founder of Code First: Girls, an organisation offering free web programming courses for women in university. Bentinck was named one of the Fifty Most Inspiring Women in European Tech by the Inspiring Fifty organisation in 2015.

== Early life and education ==
The daughter of Major Vivian Mark Bentinck, of the Royal Marines (a descendant of Admiral Sir Rudolph Bentinck, Commander-in-Chief, Plymouth, of the Barons Bentinck) and Dr. Miranda Whitehead, Bentinck grew up in the New Forest region of southern England. She attended the Godolphin School in Salisbury, an all-girls boarding school. There she enrolled in Young Enterprise, creating a business model for handmade purses. She then attended the Nottingham University Business School, graduating with a bachelor of arts in management studies, with first-class honours.

== Career ==
Prior to founding EF, Bentinck interned in the office of Tony Blair in London, where she also assisted the Africa Governance Initiative. From 2009 to 2011 she was a management consultant in the London office of McKinsey & Company.

Bentinck and Clifford met in 2009 while working at McKinsey. After noticing that entrepreneurship was not seen as a viable career option for talented and ambitious individuals in Europe, unlike in Silicon Valley, they decided to found Entrepreneurs First in 2011. Alice initially served as CPO at EF before taking over from Matt as CEO in 2023.

Noticing that most individuals applying to Entrepreneurs First were male, Bentinck and Clifford founded Code First Girls in 2012. The non-profit is the largest provider of free coding courses for women in the UK, delivering over £20 million worth of free technology education and teaching three times as many women to code as the entire UK university undergraduate system. Code First Girls has now taught over 55,000 women to code for free at university level and has significantly impacted the technology landscape. Since 2015, Bentinck has also served on their board and helped raise £4.5M in Series A for them from leading VCs including Active Partners and Samos investments.

EF's first international office was opened in Singapore in 2016, bringing the same company building model to Asia.

In 2017, it was announced that Reid Hoffman, co-founder of LinkedIn and Partner at Greylock, was leading a $12.4million investment into Entrepreneurs First. As part of his investment, Hoffman also joined the board of EF.

In December 2023, it was announced that Bentinck would take over as CEO of Entrepreneurs First after Matt Clifford stepped down from the role to concentrate on opportunities in artificial intelligence.

As of 2025 Entrepreneurs First's combined portfolio is worth over $11b with global sites in London, Paris, Bangalore, New York and San Francisco.

== Other activities ==
In 2014 Bentinck was appointed one of the Prime Minister's advisors for the Northern Future Forum in Helsinki.

She has been a member of the advisory board of Founders4Schools since April 2014, and a member of the Computer Science Department Industrial Liaison Board at Imperial College London since April 2015. In September 2015 she became a mentor for Girls in Tech London.

From 2019-2022 Alice was served as a committee member of the UK AI Council, as part of a group of business and tech leaders that provided advice to the UK Government and high-level leadership on the Artificial Intelligent ecosystem. Other members of the committee included Chris Bishop, Microsoft Technical Fellow and Director of the Microsoft Research Lab in Cambridge and Mustafa Suleyman cofounder of DeepMind.

In 2022 and 2023, Alice was announced as a member of Prime Ministers Boris Johnson and later Rishi Sunak's Business Council, a group of industry leaders working in partnership with the government to deliver high productivity and growth in the UK. The Council works in partnership with the Government, to unlock investment, harness innovation and improve access to skills and talent.

In 2022 Alice co-authored the book, 'How to be a Founder,' with Matt Clifford as an essential guide on how entrepreneurs can identify, fund, and launch their best ideas. The book was published by Bloomsbury, the publisher behind Harry Potter, and won the 2023 award for Best Startup Book at the Business Book Awards.

== Honours and awards ==
In 2015 Alice was named one of the Fifty Most Inspiring Women in European Tech by the Inspiring Fifty organisation.

In 2013 she was ranked No. 19 on The Drum's "30 Under 30 Women in Digital" list. She was a Top 25 finalist in the Tech City Movers and Shakers 2013 and the Girls in Tech Ones to Watch 2013.

In 2014 she was named to several newspaper and magazine lists. She was named one of "The 1000 – London's Most Influential People" by the London Evening Standard, one of the "35 Women Under 35" by Management Today, and was cited as a "Rising Star" by Computer Weekly as part of their 2014 Most Influential Women in UK IT campaign. Additionally, the British Interactive Media Association included her on its BIMA Hot 100 of 2014.

Bentinck was appointed Member of the Order of the British Empire (MBE) in the 2016 Birthday Honours for services to business.

In 2017, Bentinck was named by Computer Weekly as one of the most influential women in UK IT. She was again named by the London Evening Standard as one of London's most influential people in the Progress 1000: Capitalisers/Entrepreneurs category.

== Selected articles ==
- "Taking the Plunge". The Huffington Post. 22 September 2015.
- "Stop Doing Pointless Networking". Real Business. 16 September 2015. Archived from the original on 5 March 2016.
- Bentinck, Alice (21 July 2015). "How Can the UK Build More Deep Tech Startups?". Tech World.
- "You're Doing Lean Wrong". Tech World. 30 June 2015.
- "RIP Accelerators?". Tech World. 1 June 2015.
- Bentinck, Alice (27 April 2015). "Build a Product, Not a Startup". Tech World.
- "Why Backing Technical Founders is the Way Forward". Tech World. 14 April 2015.
- "Style and Facebook: Promoting Women Role Models"
