= Todd Davis (businessman) =

American businessman (born 1968)

- Born: Richard Todd Davis; 1968 (age 57–58); South Carolina
- Education: Baylor University
- Occupations: Cofounder, chairman, and CEO
- Known for: LifeLock

Richard Todd Davis (born 1968) is an American businessman. He is the co-founder of LifeLock, an identity theft protection company based in Tempe, Arizona, that became a subsidiary of Symantec in 2017.

== Education ==
Davis received his Bachelor of Business Administration in entrepreneurship and management from Baylor University in 1990.

== Career ==
After graduating from Baylor, Davis was on executive management teams of several technology startups. He joined Dell in 1992, where he signed clients such as 3M. Davis became a member of the President's Elite Circle and received the Dell Vision Award while with the company. In 2002, Davis started his own business, Marketing Champions, where he was CEO and worked with teams from NASCAR and the Indy Racing League (now known as the IndyCar Series).

In 2005, Davis and Robert Maynard Jr. cofounded LifeLock, a personal fraud protection company. Davis was CEO of LifeLock since its founding. As part of a marketing campaign to promote his company's credit monitoring services, Davis posted his own social security number on billboards and commercials. As a result, he was a victim of at least 13 cases of identity theft between 2007 and 2008, belying LifeLock's claims that its services protect consumers against identity theft and fraud. The Federal Trade Commission imposed a $12 million penalty on the company for deceptive advertising, likening Davis and LifeLock marketers to "con artists."

In 2010 the company ranked eighth on Inc.'s 500 list. In 2012 Davis took the company public. By 2014 LifeLock had over 3 million subscribers and 700 employees.

In January 2016 Davis resigned as CEO of LifeLock; he became executive vice chairman of the board of directors on March 1, 2016. LifeLock became NortonLifeLock in February 2017.

== Other activities ==
Davis is a regular speaker at conferences and other events. In April 2013 he was a speaker at the Startup America Summit in Phoenix, Arizona, the Silicon Desert December Meetup, and the company also presented a free identity theft summit for local law enforcement officials in Arizona. Davis presented at the 2014 South by Southwest Online Privacy: Nuclear Meltdown or NextGen Fuel discussions. He was selected to speak at the 2014 Global Ethics Summit, and participated in the 2014 Inside the Reporter's Notebook event for the Phoenix Business Journal.

Davis has contributed to Forbes and HuffPost with identity theft protection advice for individuals.

== Philanthropy ==
Davis, through LifeLock, contributes to Conquer Paralysis Now and is on the board of directors. The foundation, founded in 2001, works to find a cure for paralysis. He is an honorary advisor of the National Organization for Victim Assistance as well as an honorary board member for BioAccel. He is also on the board of directors for the Boys & Girls Club of Greater Phoenix.

== Recognition ==
Davis won the Ernst & Young Entrepreneur of the Year for Top Emerging Company for Orange County and Desert Cities in 2009. He was also awarded CRM Magazine's Service Elite Award, the Arizona Business Leadership Association's Leadership Award, and listed in Arizona Business Journal's 25 Most Admired CEOs in 2009.

== See also ==
- FICO
