= Renaissance Philanthropy =

American philanthropic organization

- Industry: Philanthropy
- Founder: Thomas Kalil
- Headquarters: New York, New York
- Website: www.renaissancephilanthropy.org

Renaissance Philanthropy is an American philanthropic organization that develops and operates philanthropic funds focused on science, technology, and innovation. It was founded in 2024 by Tom Kalil and Kumar Garg, who previously worked in science and technology policy in the Obama administration and later at Schmidt Futures. Initial support for the organization came from Eric and Wendy Schmidt.

The organization uses time-limited funds led by subject matter experts to direct philanthropic capital toward specific research, technology, and social policy objectives. By May 2026, Science|Business reported that Renaissance Philanthropy had mobilized over $533 million during its first two years.

== Funding model ==
Renaissance Philanthropy describes its approach as a "thesis-driven philanthropic fund" model. Under the model, a fund is organized around a defined objective and time period and is led by a specialist who makes funding decisions. Donors provide capital while generally delegating individual grantmaking decisions to the fund leader. Kalil and Anna McKelvey have compared the structure to the relationship between limited partners and general partners in venture capital.

Science|Business described the organization's approach as drawing on both venture capital structures and the program management model used by the U.S. Advanced Research Projects Agencies.

== Initiatives ==
=== AI for Math Fund ===
In December 2024, Renaissance Philanthropy and the quantitative trading firm XTX Markets launched the AI for Math Fund with an initial $9.2 million commitment from XTX Markets. The fund supports open-source projects applying artificial intelligence and machine learning to mathematics, including automated theorem proving, mathematical datasets, and software tools for researchers. Bloomberg reported that the initiative was intended to develop AI tools for mathematicians analogous to the coding assistants increasingly used by software developers.

The first funding round attracted 280 applicants. In September 2025, the fund announced $18 million in grants to 29 projects at universities and research organisations. Renaissance and XTX Markets subsequently announced an additional $13.5 million commitment in March 2026, bringing announced funding for the initiative to $31.5 million.

=== Big if True Science Accelerator ===
Renaissance Philanthropy launched the Big if True Science (BiTS) Accelerator in 2025 to train scientists and technologists to design and lead large, coordinated research programs. The program focuses on research proposals that require multiple technical teams and fall outside conventional academic research grants or venture capital funding.

The program subsequently expanded internationally through partnerships with government-backed research and innovation agencies. According to Science|Business, Renaissance partnered with Germany's Federal Agency for Disruptive Innovation in 2025 on a European cohort.

=== Chimaera Fund ===
The Chimaera Fund supports research and demonstration projects related to geologic hydrogen, hydrogen that occurs naturally underground. In 2026, the fund began working with the United States Department of the Air Force on an initiative evaluating whether geologic hydrogen could contribute to energy resilience at military installations. The project selected HyTerra, Helix Exploration, and Prometheus Hydrogen to provide exploration, production, and hydrogen-storage capabilities for work associated with Malmstrom Air Force Base in Montana and McConnell Air Force Base in Kansas.

=== Open Source for Science Fund ===
Renaissance Philanthropy launched the Open Source for Science Fund in May 2026 to support the development and maintenance of open-source software used in scientific research. The fund was seeded with $20 million in funding by Biohub and the Wellcome Trust. The inaugural funding call was called "Open Source for the Life Sciences", with two funding tracks with grants of up to $250,000 and $1 million in each. The fund, initially focused on the life sciences, was designed as a continuation of the Essential Open Source Software for Science (EOSS) series run by the Chan Zuckerberg Initiative, which awarded $58 million to 230 open-source software projects over six years.

=== Africa Jobs Fund ===
In May 2026, Renaissance Philanthropy began backing the Africa Jobs Fund, founded by entrepreneur Daniel Yu. The fund focuses on businesses intended to generate higher-productivity employment in sub-Saharan Africa, particularly through export manufacturing and international labor mobility.

Semafor reported that the fund planned to mobilize $100 million over five years. Yu told the publication that using philanthropic rather than conventional venture capital funding was intended to allow the fund to make longer-term and higher-risk investments. Former United States Agency for International Development administrator Samantha Power and entrepreneur Iyinoluwa Aboyeji were named as advisers to the fund.

=== Northwest Arkansas Innovation Fund ===
In July 2026, Renaissance Philanthropy launched the Northwest Arkansas Innovation Fund with support from the Walton Family Foundation. The $7.5 million initiative was established to support early-stage businesses and entrepreneurial talent in Northwest Arkansas. The initiative consists of two programs: Catalyze479, a revolving investment fund for early-stage companies, and Launch479, a fellowship for entrepreneurs and technical leaders. Axios reported that Catalyze479 planned to make investments of up to $500,000 in companies that were generally too early for conventional venture-capital financing.

=== Arctic Stabilization Initiative ===
Renaissance Philanthropy incubated the Arctic Stabilization Initiative (ASI) through its Advanced Research for Climate Emergencies fund in 2025 and publicly launched the initiative in April 2026. ASI funds research into targeted interventions intended to reduce risks associated with Arctic warming, including the loss of sea ice and other potential climate tipping points.

ASI's initial research focus is mixed-phase cloud thinning, a proposed form of climate intervention in which particles that promote ice formation would be introduced into certain Arctic clouds. The approach is intended to reduce the clouds' heat trapping effect during periods when longwave radiation dominates, allowing more heat to escape from the surface. Heatmap described the technique as similar to conventional cloud seeding and reported that ASI planned to first investigate it through modeling and observational research rather than deployment. Independent assessments by SRM360 and Ocean Visions have also identified mixed-phase cloud thinning as a proposed approach to Arctic cooling while noting substantial uncertainties and the need for further research.

At its public launch, Heatmap reported that ASI had raised $6.5 million toward a planned five-year budget of $55 million. The initiative is led by atmospheric scientist Charlotte DeWald and uses a stage-gated research model in which proposed interventions can be discontinued if early research indicates that they are ineffective or pose unacceptable environmental risks.

=== AI Talent Accelerator ===
In May 2026, Renaissance Philanthropy launched the AI Talent Accelerator, which pairs a cohort of organizations with engineers from Renaissance Philanthropy’s Engineering Hub. The initiative was supported by the Valhalla Foundation, Walton Family Foundation, Schusterman Family Philanthropies, Overdeck Family Foundation, and Siegel Family Endowment. In August 2026, the organization launched a new track, the AI Foundations Studio.

=== Other initiatives ===
Renaissance Philanthropy also operates additional initiatives including the Advanced Research for Climate Emergencies Fund, the Public Benefit Innovation Fund, the Housing Abundance Philanthropy Fund, and the UK Dynamism Fund, in the fields of climate science, public benefit innovation, housing, research in mathematics, artificial intelligence, and biology, and national development.

== Partners ==
Renaissance Philanthropy told the Guardian the organization is “working with several governments on building their R&D ecosystems, including in the UK, Germany, Japan, and the U.S.,” including partnerships with the UK Advanced Research and Inventions Agency and United States Air Force. The Guardian reported that Renaissance Philanthropy’s UK entity had received £13.3 million from ARIA.

In April 2026, Priscilla Chan announced Biohub’s Virtual Biology Initiative, writing in Time that Renaissance Philanthropy joined as a partner to catalyze funding.

== See also ==
- Philanthrocapitalism
- Venture philanthropy
- List of philanthropists
- Convergent Research
- Focused research organizations (FROs)
