= Francesca Bria =

Italian informatician (born 1977)

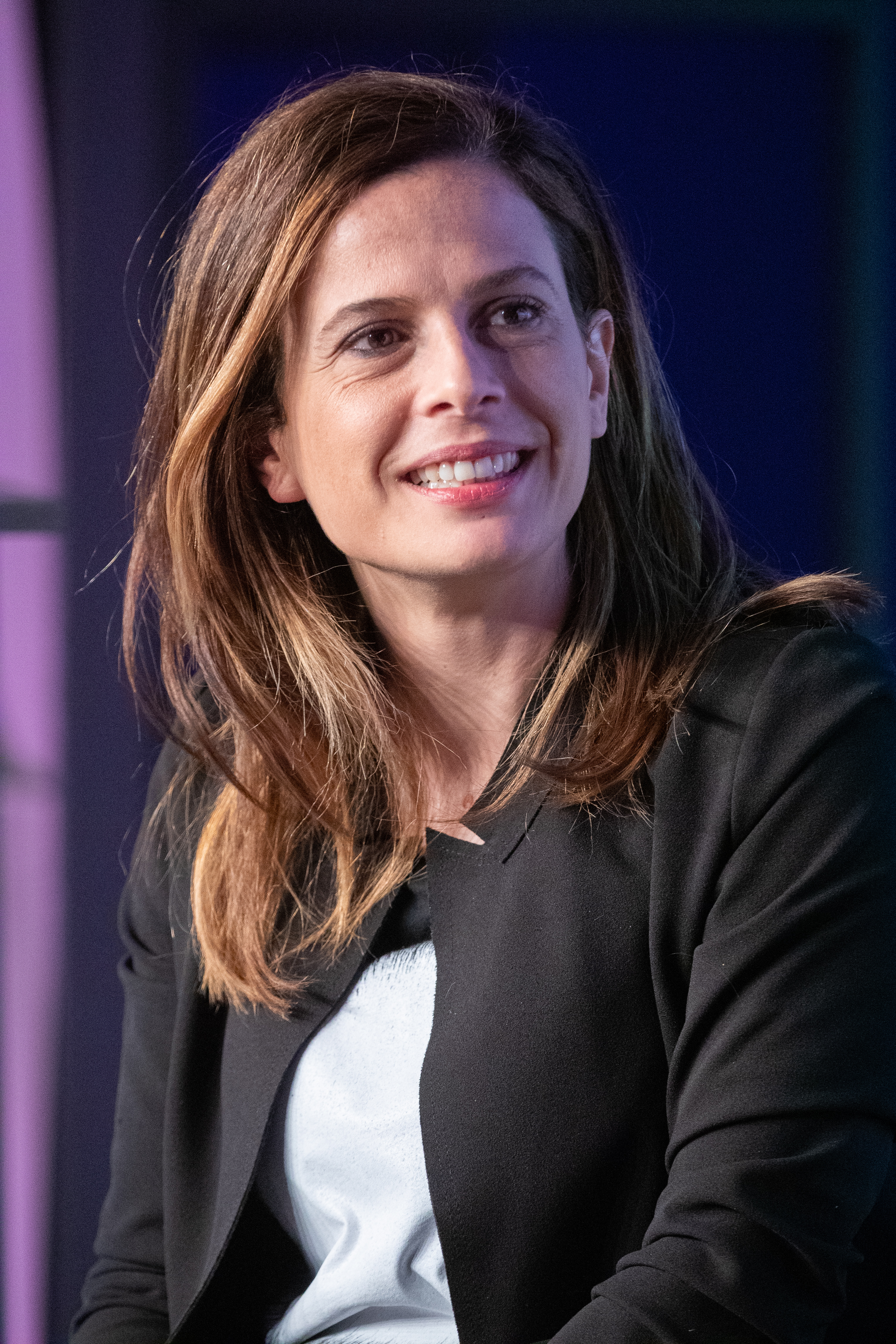
- Bria in 2019
- Born: November 11, 1977 (age 48)
- Education: Imperial College London
- Website: francescabria.com

Francesca Bria (born 11 November 1977) is an Italian innovation economist, digital policy expert, and information technologist working at the intersection of technology, geopolitics, economics and society, who lectures at various universities and is a consultant amongst others to the United Nations and the European Commission.

Bria is Honorary Professor in the Institute for Innovation and Public Purpose at University College London (UCL), where she teaches courses on digital capitalism and digital cities. She is part of the Management Board of the Italian public broadcast company RAI, and a member of the EC President Ursula von der Leyen's High level Roundtable for The New European Bauhaus.

She is a senior adviser and Ambassador to the United Nation (UN-Habitat) on digital cities and digital rights. She is the former Chief Digital Technology and Innovation Officer for the City of Barcelona and founder of the UN Cities Coalition for Digital Rights and the Decode Project, an EU-wide effort to reclaim citizen's data sovereignty.

She is an Honorary Professor on Technology and Innovation Policy at UCL, where she teaches about the platform economy, digital sovereignty and people-centered smart cities.

== Biography ==
Francesca Bria was raised in the Monti district of Rome. Her father Pietro Bria was a psychoanalyst and her mother Annavera Pifano an Olympic gymnast.

Bria was the President of the Italian National Innovation Fund from 2020 to 2024 and is an Executive Board Member of the Italian public media company RAI.

She graduated with a BSc in social sciences for international cooperation from Sapienza university. She then moved to London and gained an MSc in E-business and Innovation from the University College of London and a PhD in Innovation economics and management from Imperial College in London. Bria joined Nesta, a UK based innovation agency, where she was to remain for 8 years, and was promoted to senior project lead, showing a strong leadership on European digital policies and digital social innovation. While still at Nesta, Bria also lectured at various universities, along with consulting and facilitating various projects in the UK and Europe, with clients ranging from grassroots NGOs to national governments and businesses.

She was EU Coordinator of the D-CENT project (Decentralised Citizens ENgagement Technologies). This involved building digital tools and platforms to help citizens engage in large scale democratic deliberation, integrating the collective intelligence of citizens in the political decision-making process, and included elements of deliberative democracy, direct democracy and participatory budgeting. She was also principal investigator of the DSI project on digital social innovation in Europe.

Bria has been a member of the Internet of Things Council and an advisor for the European Commission on Future Internet and Smart Cities policy. She is also a member of the EC Expert Group on Open Innovation (OISPG) and a member of the European Research Cluster on the Internet of Things (IERC).

Bria advised the City of Rome and the Region of Lazio on innovation policy, open technology, and open cities. She has been teaching in several universities in the UK and Italy and she has advised Governments, public and private organizations on technology and innovation policy, and its socio-economic and environmental impact. She is also active in various organizations advocating for open access, digital rights, and decentralized, privacy-aware technologies.

Bria's work with D-CENT brought her to the attention of Ada Colau, who in 2016 invited her to become the CTO of Barcelona. Bria moved from London to the Spanish city, where she remained until 2020. In January 2020 she was appointed president of Italy's newly created national innovation fund, a role she performs in parallel with lecturing and consulting on digital transformation, democracy and innovation to the United Nations and European Commission. In 2021 she was elected by the Italian Parliament in the Management Board of RAI, the Italian public broadcast media.

== Other activities ==
- European Innovation Council, Member of the Board (since 2025)

== Awards ==
Bria has been nominated Commander of the Order of Merit of the Italian Republic. She is also Culture Persons of the Year 2020 according to the newspaper Frankfurter Allgemeine Zeitung (FAZ). She has been listed in the top 50 Women in Tech by Forbes, and in the World's top 20 most influential people in digital government by Apolitical. She has also been featured in the Italian Magazine Repubblica "D", amongst the 100 Women Changing the World.
