= Code First Girls =

Coding organization for women and non-binary people

- Company type: Limited company
- Industry: High tech startups
- Founded: 2012
- Founders: Alice Bentinck, Matt Clifford
- Headquarters: London, England
- Area served: United Kingdom, Republic of Ireland, USA, Switzerland, The Netherlands
- Key people: Anna Brailsford, CEO
- Website: codefirstgirls.org.uk

Code First Girls is a social enterprise that provides free coding courses to women and non-binary people across the UK, Ireland, the USA, Switzerland and the Netherlands. The organization helps companies recruit more women into the tech sector by connecting them with newly trained female developers. Their community of coders, instructors, and mentors is one of the largest in the UK. According to the organisation, as of 2022 they've trained over 50,000 women.

The organisation's stated goal is to "promote gender diversity and female participation in the technology sector by offering free courses for students and professional women who are wanting to re-train." They also support businesses to train staff and encourage levelling-up for female staff within organisations.

As of 2020, Code First Girls is reported to have provided in excess of £10 million worth of free coding courses to more than 18,000 women since 2013.

In 2017, Code First Girls announced the launch of the "Code First: Girls 20:20 campaign" with the aim to "train 20,000 women to code for free by the end of 2020". As of 2018, Code First: Girls have announced "2020 campaign partnerships" with the following companies: Bank of America Merrill Lynch; Goldman Sachs; KKR; Trainline; and OVH. The organisation announced Baroness Martha Lane-Fox and Dame Stephanie Shirley as supporting the campaign as ambassadors.

== History ==
Code First Girls began in late 2012 as "a nine-week, free, part-time course to get female graduates from all walks of life not only interested in coding, but also better equipped to contribute to technical discussions in high-tech businesses".

Founded by Alice Bentinck and Matt Clifford, Code First: Girls was created when Bentinck and Clifford recognised a lack of female applications for their pre-seed investment programme Entrepreneur First (EF).

Bentinck claims that of the first cohort to complete Code First: Girls training, more than half of the women participants self-identified as "technical" or working in software-development roles.

Amali de Alwis was announced as first Chief Executive Officer of the organisation on Wednesday 8 April 2015, taking over from Bentinck and Clifford. Anna Brailsford succeeded Aamil de Alwis as CEO in 2019.

== Awards ==
In 2016 Code First: Girls was nominated for a National Diversity Award.
