= Kathleen Fisher =

American computer scientist

Kathleen Shanahan Fisher
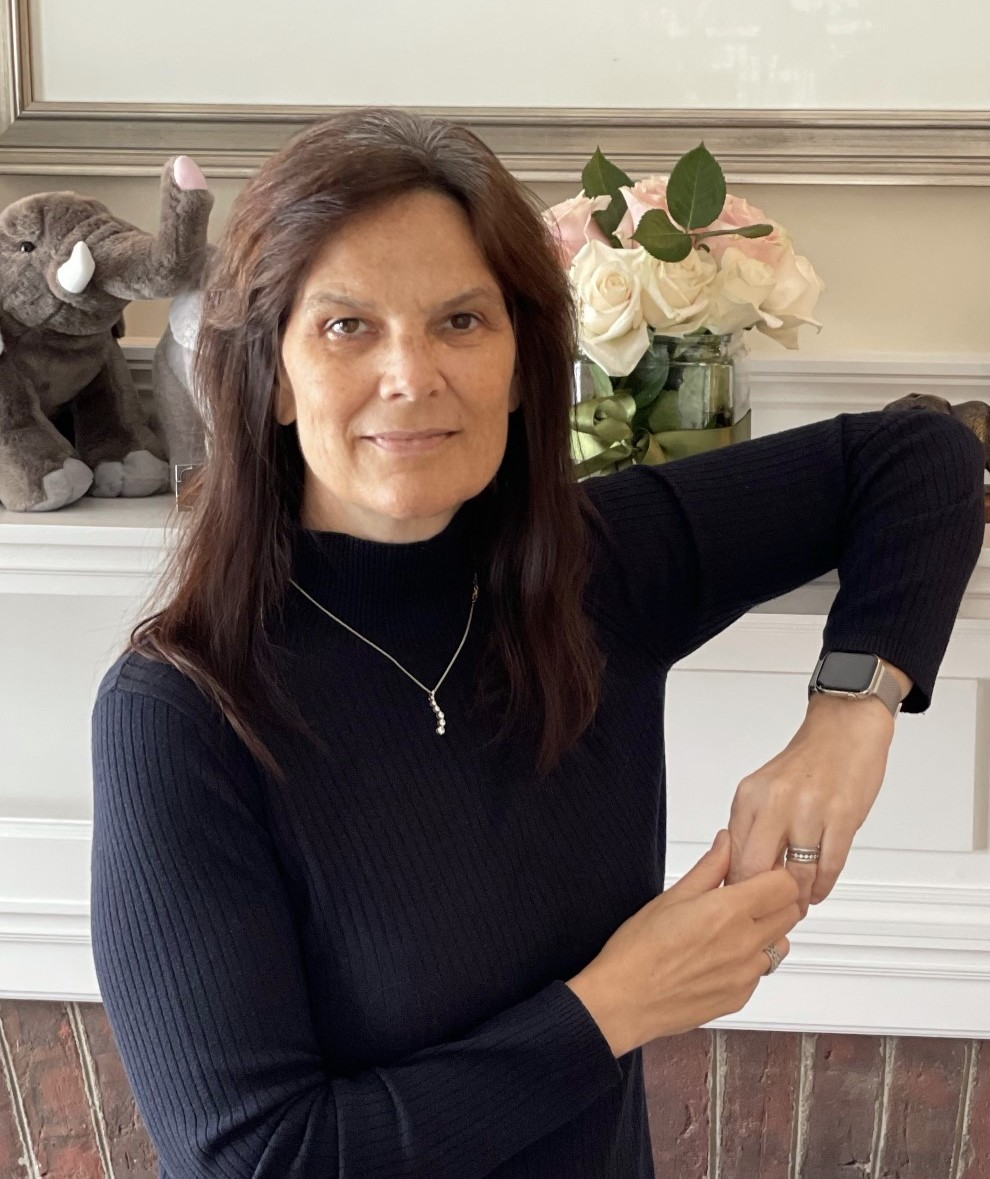
- Education: Stanford University
- Known for: Moby programming language
- Awards: ACM Fellow, AAAS Fellow
- Scientific career
- Fields: Computer science
- Workplaces: AT&T Labs; Tufts University; ARIA
- Doctoral advisor: John C. Mitchell

Kathleen Shanahan Fisher is an American computer scientist who specializes in programming languages and their implementation.

Fisher is CEO of ARIA and an adjunct professor at Tufts University. She is one of the authors of the PADS data description language and the Moby experimental concurrent programming language. She is a past Chair of the ACM Special Interest Group in Programming Languages (SIGPLAN) and has chaired three of their major conferences, ICFP in 2004, OOPSLA in 2011, and PLDI in 2019. She co-founded SIGPLAN’s Programming Language Mentoring Workshop (PLMW) Series in an effort to increase the number of women and underrepresented minorities in computer science and was co-chair of the Computing Research Association's Committee on the Status of Women for three years. In 2010, she was elected as an ACM Fellow "for contributions to programming language design, theory, and practice, and for service to the computing community." She is also a member of the Board of Trustees of Harvey Mudd College.

== Early life and education ==
Fisher was born in 1969 in San Marino, California. Her father was an investment professional and her mother worked peripatetically in engineering, providing an example "that women could do math, science, or anything else we put out mind to. She graduated from San Marino High School before attending Stanford University.

In her freshman year she decided to take a computer science course to learn how to use the IBM PS/2 Model 60 computer her dad had bought her. Interested in the material, she took another class and came across the halting problem. She found the proof behind it simple yet elegant, and the experience marked a turning point in her interest in computer science. She graduated Stanford with distinction in 1991 with a BSc math and computational science and stayed on at Stanford for her graduate studies.

In 1996, she graduated with a PhD in computer science under the supervision of Dr. John C. Mitchell. A Hertz Fellow during the tenure of her graduate work, Fisher's doctoral thesis was entitled Type Systems for Object-Oriented Languages.

== Career ==
After graduation Fisher started working at AT&T Labs Research. In April 2002 she was promoted to principal member of technical staff. From July 2008 to March 2011, she was also a consulting professor in computer science at Stanford.

=== DARPA ===
In 2011, she left AT&T Labs to become a Program Manager at DARPA. At DARPA she founded and ran the High-Assurance Cyber Military Systems (HACMS) and the Probabilistic Programming for Advancing Machine Learning (PPAML) programs. The HACMS program focused on leveraging Formal Methods to secure military vehicles from hacking. The program utilized a red team of hackers which attempted to break into a quadcopter with full knowledge of the system using any method besides a physical connection. Initially, the red team was able to quickly compromise the quadcopter, but by the end of the program they were not able to break into the quadcopter at all. This program was a huge success and has since been transitioned to more complex vehicles such as Boeing’s Unmanned Little Bird. Fisher left DARPA in July 2014 but continues to chair their ISAT Study Group.

=== Tufts University ===
While continuing work at DARPA, Fisher accepted a job as a professor of computer science at Tufts University, where she still works today as the department chair. Her current research focuses on developing domain-specific languages, program synthesis, and using formal methods to secure software. At Tufts she has taught programming languages as well as seminars in programming language design.

=== ARIA ===
In November 2025, it was announced that Fisher had been appointed as CEO of ARIA and would join them in February 2026 to direct operations.

== Honors and awards ==
Fisher has received many honors, including:

- 2021: AAAS Fellow
- 2013: SIGPLAN Distinguished Service Award
- 2012: Distinguished PLDI Paper
- 2012: SIGPLAN CACM Research Highlights Nominated Paper
- 2011: PLDI Best Paper Award
- 2010: ACM Fellow
- 2008: SIGPLAN CACM Research Highlights Nominated Paper
- 2007: ACM Distinguished Scientist
- 2000: Best Research Paper Award, KDD
- 1996: NSF Mathematical Sciences Postdoctoral Research Fellowship, declined.
- 1996: The University of California President’s Postdoctoral Fellowship, declined.
- 1995: Student Service Award, Stanford Computer Science Department
- 1994–1996: Hertz Foundation Fellowship
- 1993: Finch Fellowship
- 1991–1994: NSF Graduate Research Fellowship

== Personal life ==
Fisher, in part, credits her daughter's birth, concurrent with her Ph.D. work at Stanford, with prompting the "focus" needed to complete her graduate work in a timely and effective manner.
