= Advanced Research and Invention Agency =

R&D funding agency of the UK Government

Non-departmental public body overview
- Formed: 26 January 2023; 3 years ago
- Employees: 53 (FY2024/25)
- Annual budget: £276 million (FY2024/25)
- Ministers responsible: Jonathan Reynolds MP, Secretary of State for Business, Innovation, Science and Trade; Chris McDonald MP, Minister of State for Science, Innovation and Investment
- Non-departmental public body executives: Dr Kathleen Fisher, CEO; Matt Clifford CBE, Chair
- Parent department: Department for Business, Innovation, Science and Trade
- Website: www.aria.org.uk

The Advanced Research and Invention Agency (ARIA) often abbreviated to ARIA is a British non-departmental public body established by Dominic Cummings and mandated in law via the Advanced Research and Invention Agency Act 2022.

The parliamentary act created the legislative framework for the agency. It was formally established as an independent research body in January 2023.

ARIA has a similar remit to the United States' DARPA It is designed to operate with a large degree of autonomy and is exempt from Freedom of Information requests.

It funds high-risk scientific research such as climate engineering, brain–computer interfaces, genetically modified crops, robotics and artificial intelligence.

== History ==
=== Formation ===
The political strategist Dominic Cummings, acting as Boris Johnson's chief advisor, suggested that the United Kingdom might benefit from a research agency akin to the United States' DARPA agency. Cummings proposed that the organisation should be legally mandated to fund high-risk projects, operate independently of parliament and be exempt from freedom of information laws. Labour later tried to repeal ARIA's freedom of information exemption but was defeated.Labour Party MP Member of Parliament Dawn Butler said this would "raise alarm bells" about how taxpayer money is spent, in light of a scandal over how the UK government procured PPE contracts during the COVID-19 pandemic. The (then) Business Secretary Kwasi Kwarteng insisted the "corporate governance arrangements are very robust" and that MPs would be able to scrutinise the agency's accounts.

Kwarteng announced the non-departmental public body (NGO) in February 2022. Its press release referenced several British inventors and claimed that the NGO would be modelled on the Defense Advanced Research Projects Agency (DARPA): "More recently, ARPA's successor, DARPA, was a vital pre-pandemic funder of mRNA vaccines and antibody therapies, leading to critical COVID therapies." - gov.uk

It was established in January 2023 and received £800 million in government funding. Its sponsor is the Department for Business, Energy and Industrial Strategy.

Parliament established ARIA in statute and set a ten-year legal mandate. The law directs the agency to fund research that is risky, uncertain and speculative in nature.

In 2022, Dominic Cummings suggested that ARIA should act as a "moonshot" programme akin to the United States' DARPA. It operates independently of the UK government's main funding body, UKRI. The agency avoids DARPA's connection to military research.

On 20 July 2022, the Department for Business, Energy and Industrial Strategy announced that ARIA's first CEO would be Ilan Gur and its first Chair would be Matt Clifford. In early 2023, it was announced that Nobel prize-winning organic chemist Sir David MacMillan and Dame Kate Bingham, the entrepreneur who headed the Vaccine Taskforce, would join the board.

=== 2024-present ===
Ilan Gur and Matt Clifford appeared in front of the Parliamentary Select Committee in September 2025.

During the hearing, Labour's Allison Gardner questioned Clifford and Gur about their risk appetite. Specifically, she asked whether the Economic and Social Research Council (ESRC) has the authority to stop ARIA's projects. Gur replied, "they don't"

In 2025, the UK Government committed to providing ARIA with a minimum of £1bn over the spending review period of 2025–2029.

Following the Government's June 2025 Spending Review, the Department of Science and Technology (DSIT) has committed to providing ARIA with a minimum of £1bn over the Spending Review period.

In 2026, the Guardian reported that ARIA gave away £23m to nine US-based technology companies and £29.4m to three venture capital groups, also from the United States of America. They gave £5.4m to Venture Café to set up cafés in the UK and paid £7m to another US firm for a limited run of entrepreneurship courses. The economist Cecilia Rikap accused the NGO of "taxpayer money to further expand the power of the US tech ecosystem". Two of ARIA's recipients registered with Companies House days before receiving amounts exceeding £10m each.

== Organisation ==
On 20 July 2022, the Department for Business, Energy and Industrial Strategy announced that ARIA's first CEO would be Ilan Gur and its first Chair would be Matt Clifford.

Previously, Gur served as a founding Programme Director at ARPA-E.

In early 2023, the NGO announced the addition of two new board members. They were the Nobel prize-winning organic chemist David MacMillan and the venture capitalist Kate Bingham. The latter is former chair of the Vaccine Taskforce.

The first cohort of eight Programme Directors joined ARIA in October 2023, followed by another eight in April 2025.

Gur announced in June 2025 that he was leaving his position at ARIA and in November 2025, Kathleen Fisher was appointed CEO Elect of ARIA and took over from Gur in February 2026.

ARIA's Board comprises the CEO, Kathleen Fisher; the Chair, Matt Clifford; the Government Chief Scientific Adviser, Dame Angela McLean, and five other Non-Executive Board members – appointed by the Secretary of State for DSIT – as well as three other Executive Team members, including Ant Rowstron as Chief Technology Officer, and Pippy James as Deputy Chief Executive Officer — appointed by the chair. ARIA's Advisors include Sir Demis Hassabis, the co-founder of Google DeepMind, Hayaatun Sillem, former chief executive of the Royal Academy of Engineering, and Patrick Collison, co-founder and CEO of payments company Stripe.

The NGO works with nine non-profits that it refers to as its "activation partners". It claims to have partnered with Google's DeepMind and several venture capital and philanthropy organisations.

== Genetically modified crops ==
ARIA provided £6.7M in funding to researchers at the University of Oxford to improve yields of potato and wheat. Also known as the OPTIMISE Project (Oxford Plastid Transformation for an Improved Sustainable Economy), the university claims that the project will produce crops that are more resilient to the stresses of climate change and the increased demand brought about by human overpopulation.

The NGO refers to its genetically modified crop program as its synthetic plants program. The funding is split between two teams, which it refers to as TA1 and TA2. The former operates under the design, build and deliver moniker and consists of seven teams that aim to improve the stress tolerance and photosynthetic efficiency of potatoes. The latter group is concerned with the social and ethical impacts of these technologies and how best to engage with the public on these issues.

The TA1 teams' research seeks to identify specific genetic traits in wild plants that have adapted to climate change and recreate those characteristics in staple food crops. Initially, it will focus on potatoes. Because chloroplasts carry their own DNA, the researchers aim to deploy DNA assembly techniques to construct synthetic chloroplast genomes and transfer them to the staple food crops.

The United Kingdom's Genetic Technology (Precision Breeding) Act 2023 exempts precision-edited crops from genetically modified organism regulations(GMO regulations). Therefore, under English law (Scotland and Wales have yet to ratify the bill), utilising naturally occurring chloroplast variations in plants circumvents GMO regulations. Professor Steve Kelly from the University of Oxford describes this as a "regulation-friendly approach".

== Climate engineering research ==
In April 2025, it was reported that ARIA would fund a £50 million programme of small-scale outdoor geoengineering experiments. The agency stated that the experiments would be rigorously assessed and were intended to generate data on the feasibility and risks of Solar radiation modification (SRM) technologies. These methods seek to reflect a portion of incoming sunlight, for example through the injection of reflective particles into the atmosphere or by increasing the reflectivity of clouds.

The programme was announced alongside an £11 million initiative, making the United Kingdom one of the largest funders of geoengineering research. ARIA's work is led by Professor Mark Symes.

The research has drawn criticism from some scientists, who warned of potential unintended consequences such as disrupted rainfall patterns.

In written evidence submitted to Parliament by the Action Group on Erosion, Technology, and Concentration (ETC) accused the NGO of using the UK Government's reputation and the British tapayer's money to 'legitimise outdoor geoengineering experiments' and that doing so contraviened the United Nations' Convention on Biological Diversity moratorium on solar geoengineering research.

== Ultrasound-emitting brain implants ==
ARIA funded an NHS trial that involved implanting an ultrasound-emitting brain-computer interface beneath the skulls of mentally ill and neurologically disordered patients. The device's inventors hypothesised that playing ultrasound directly into the brain would switch on clusters of neurons and enable them to fire specific neurons remotely. The researchers claimed that the technology will help them alter their patients' moods and feelings of motivation. The US-based organisation developed the technology also benefited from £6.5m in funding provided by the NGO. It has also partnered with Cambridge University Health Partners to engineer brain implants for people living with mental illnesses, neurological conditions and central nervous system injuries.

== Other funding areas ==
ARIA's other programmes include Forecasting Tipping Points, an international programme of 27 teams, led by Sarah Bohndiek and Gemma Bale, and spanning climate science, optics, computer science, mathematics, statistics, photonics, and nuclear physics; and Scaling Compute, led by Suraj Bramhavar, targeting reducing AI computing costs by a factor of 1,000.

== See also ==
- UK Research and Innovation (UKRI)
- Nikola Tesla
