= Advanced Research and Invention Agency Act 2022 =

Act of the Parliament of the United Kingdom

Advanced Research and Invention Agency Act 2022 (Note: Section 14.)
- Act of Parliament
- Parliament of the United Kingdom
- Long title: An Act to make provision for and in connection with the establishment of the Advanced Research and Invention Agency.
- Citation: 2022 c. 4
- Introduced by: Kwasi Kwarteng, Secretary of State for Business, Energy and Industrial Strategy (Commons); Lord Callanan, Parliamentary Under-Secretary of State for Business, Energy and Industrial Strategy (Lords)
- Territorial extent: England and Wales; Scotland; Northern Ireland; (Note: Section 12.)

Dates
- Royal assent: 24 February 2022
- Commencement: 24 February 2022 (Sections 10–14 and paragraph 11 of schedule 1 and section 1(2) and (3) so far as relating to it) All other provisions shall commence by secondary legislation.; (Note: Section 13.)
Other legislation
Amends	House of Commons Disqualification Act 1975; Data Protection Act 2018
Amended by	Retained EU Law (Revocation and Reform) Act 2023; Retained EU Law (Revocation and Reform) Act 2023 (Consequential Amendment) Regulations 2023; Procurement Act 2023 (Consequential and Other Amendments) Regulations 2025

Status: Amended

History of passage through Parliament

Text of statute as originally enacted

Revised text of statute as amended

The Advanced Research and Invention Agency Act 2022 (c. 4) is an act of the Parliament of the United Kingdom that creates the Advanced Research and Invention Agency. It was introduced in the House of Commons by the Secretary of State for Business, Energy and Industrial Strategy Kwasi Kwarteng on 2 March 2021.

== Background ==
The government have said that the Advanced Research and Invention Agency (ARIA) is an attempt to emulate the United States' Advanced Research Projects Agency (ARPA) and similar governmental agencies such as in Germany and Japan.

Former adviser to Prime Minister Boris Johnson, Dominic Cummings, is credited with inspiring the Government to push forward with this policy. Cummings was called in front of the Science and Technology Select Committee's inquiry into the plans for ARIA.

== Notable amendments ==
=== Purpose of ARIA ===
The SNP's Business spokesperson Stephen Flynn and Labour's Shadow Minister for Science, Research and Digital Chi Onwurah pushed an amendment to a division that would have changed the primary objective of ARIA to focus on net-zero technologies. All parties supported the amendment except the Conservatives and the DUP. The amendments failed.

=== Freedom of information ===
Labour also put forward an amendment that would have put ARIA under the scope of the Freedom of Information Act 2000 as the Act has an exemption. This amendment also failed.
