= Entrepreneurs First =

Business accelerator program

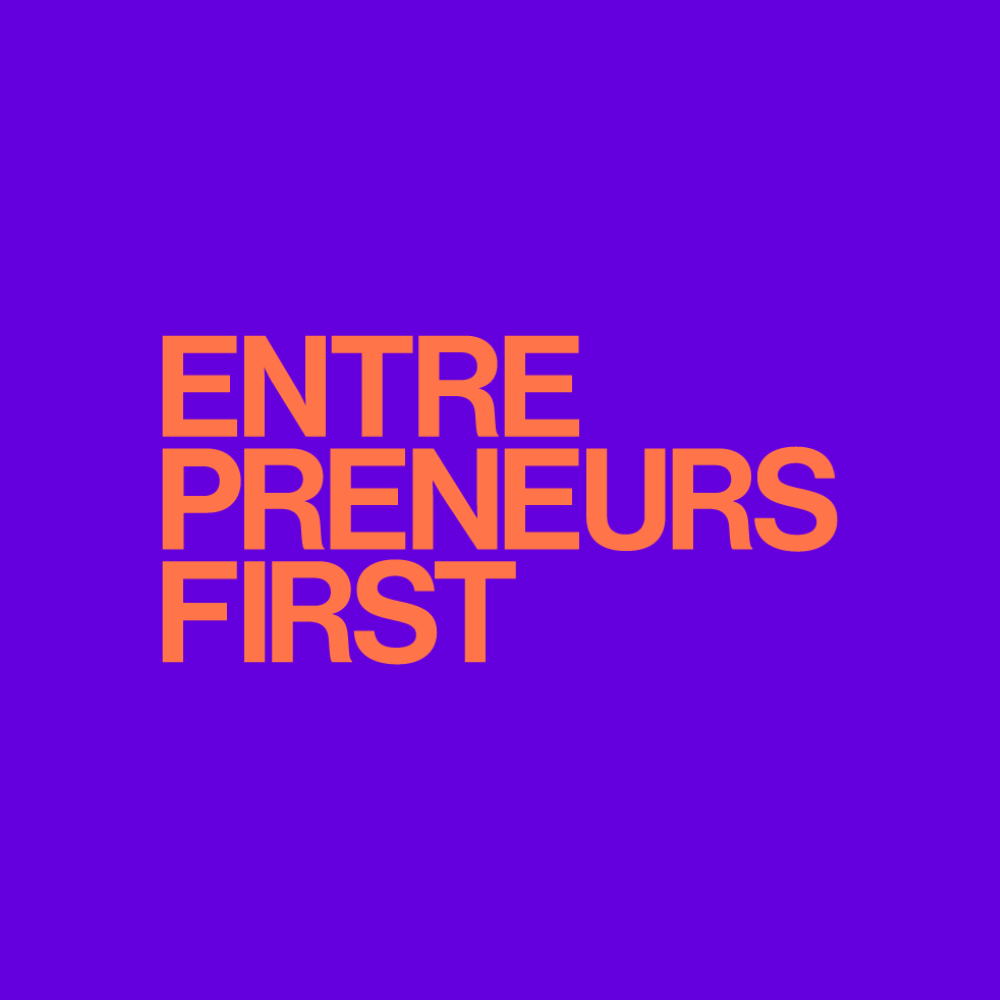
- Type: Privately held company
- Industry: High tech startups
- Founded: 2011
- Founders: Matt Clifford; Alice Bentinck
- Headquarters: London, England
- Area served: North America, Europe, Asia
- Key people: Matt Clifford, Executive Chair; Alice Bentinck, CEO
- Website: joinef.com

Entrepreneurs First (formerly Entrepreneur First, commonly shortened to EF) is a global talent investor and company builder that backs individuals before they have formed a company, team or business idea, and supports them in building technology companies. Founded in 2011 by Matt Clifford and Alice Bentinck, Entrepreneurs First initially operated as a non-profit before launching its first investment fund in 2015 and beginning to invest directly in companies formed through the programme. They have offices in London, San Francisco and Bangalore.

The company operates by investing in individuals before they have established a cofounder or a specific business concept. The program operates a selective admissions process, receiving tens of thousands of applications globally with estimated cohort acceptance rates between 1% and 3%. It is been included international startup hubs and accelerators, including in the Financial Times annual ranking of Europe's Leading Start-Up Hubs. As of now, EF has helped create more than 600 companies with a combined value of over $11 billion as of 2025.

As of 2026, companies formed through Entrepreneurs First were collectively valued $24 billion.

== History ==
Entrepreneurs First was founded in 2011 by Matt Clifford and Alice Bentinck, who had worked as management consultants at McKinsey & Company since 2009. According to Clifford, the model was inspired by a McKinsey project to develop a technology cluster in East London using university graduates to create startups. Clifford and Bentinck subsequently left McKinsey to establish the program independently. Clifford originally served as CEO while Bentinck was the CPO. In December 2023, Bentinck succeeded Clifford as chief executive, while Clifford became chair. In April 2026, Clifford moved to a non-executive chair role.

McKinsey & Company provided seed funding, and KPMG, Microsoft, and Sky were early corporate sponsors.

Bentinck and Clifford founded Code First: Girls in late 2012, an initiative aimed at increasing the representation of women in the technology and digital workforce.

In 2016, after four years of operating exclusively in London, Entrepreneurs First announced its expansion to Singapore.

Clifford and Bentinck were awarded MBEs in the 2016 Birthday Honours for services to business. In 2017, it was announced that Reid Hoffman, co-founder of LinkedIn and Partner at Greylock, was leading a $12.4 million investment into Entrepreneurs First. As part of his investment, Hoffman joined the board.

In 2018, Entrepreneurs First expanded to four additional capitals: Berlin, Hong Kong, Paris and Bangalore. The company closed its Hong Kong office in 2019, and opened a Toronto office in 2020. The Berlin, Canadian, and Singaporean office closed in Spring 2023

In July 2022, Entrepreneurs First announced the raise of a $158 million Series C. Investors in the round included John Collison; Patrick Collison; Taavet Hinrikus; Reid Hoffman; Matt Mullenweg; Tom Blomfield; Nat Friedman; Demis Hassabis; Mustafa Suleyman; Elad Gil and Lachy Groom.

In October 2023, Entrepreneurs First opened an office in San Francisco and held its first Demo Day there in April 2024. In 2024, the company began relocating startups receiving its pre-seed investment to San Francisco ahead of their seed rounds. By 2026, San Francisco had become a central part of EF’s company-building model, with funded founders from its Europe and Bangalore programmes relocating there after their initial programme phase.

In March 2026, Entrepreneurs First raised $200 million in fresh capital at a reported valuation of $1.3 billion. The round included investment from technology founders and investors including John and Patrick Collison, Eric Schmidt, Danny Rimer, Matt Cohler, Mati Staniszewski and Dennis Hassabis.

== Portfolio ==
Entrepreneurs First’s portfolio companies were collectively valued at more than $16 billion as of 2026 and include a number of unicorns and successful exits.

Entrepreneurs First's portfolio companies have been backed by leading investors, including Benchmark, Founders Fund, Khosla Ventures, Sequoia and Andreessen Horowitz.

Companies founded through Entrepreneurs First include Open Cosmos, Cleo, Aztec, Gensyn, PolyAI and OLIX.

== Investors ==
Investors in Entrepreneurs First include Founders Fund and Greylock, alongside technology founders and investors such as John and Patrick Collison, Reid Hoffman, Eric Schmidt, Demis Hassabis, Taavet Hinrikus, Matt Mullenweg, Charlie Songhurst, Christa Davies, Lachy Groom, Aidan Gomez, Mati Staniszewski, Danny Rimer and Matt Cohler.

== Program ==
Entrepreneurs First operates different programmes according to geography and founder stage. Its programmes usually begin with a full-time company-building phase focused on cofounder formation and idea development. Participants receive equity-free financial support during this period.

Teams selected by EF’s Investment Committee can receive up to $250,000 in pre-seed investment. The standard offer includes $125,000 through a post-money SAFE for 8% of the company, with an optional additional $125,000 through an uncapped MFN SAFE for eligible companies.

Funded teams subsequently relocate to San Francisco, where EF provides office space, company-building support and access to its network of founders, advisors and investors before its San Francisco Demo Day.

EF also operates programmes aimed at founders at different stages. In the United States, it offers both a funded residency for people ready to build full-time and an equity-free Fellowship for individuals still exploring ideas or potential cofounders. For Europeans, EF also operates The Bridge, a San Francisco residency aimed at non-American founders, and programmes for experienced founders.

=== Application process ===
Entrepreneurs First evaluates applicants as individuals rather than requiring an existing company, cofounder or business plan. Its programmes target founders at different stages, ranging from students and recent graduates to experienced operators and repeat founders.

The program receives a large number of applications per cohort but is highly selective, taking only a small percentage of these people per cohort. Many applicants are graduates from top universities in the countries of operations such as University of Cambridge, Imperial College London, University of Edinburgh, University College London in the UK, top universities in Europe, the Ivy League universities in the US and the IIT/IIMs in India. The organization recruits university graduates directly on a generous stipend, presenting the program as an alternative to corporate employment or postgraduate academic research.

Entrepreneurs First differs from other accelerators such as Y Combinator in that it works with individuals rather than companies.

In 2026, around 10% of EF companies raising funding rounds did so with either Benchmark, Founders Fund, Khosla Ventures or Index Ventures.
