= Lemon Wallet =

Former digital wallet

Lemon, Inc.
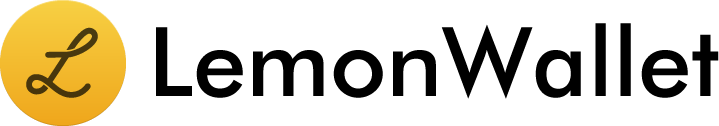
- Website type: Online service
- Available in: English
- Founded: July 2011
- Headquarters: Palo Alto, California, United States
- No. of locations: 1 (in Argentina)
- Area served: United States
- Founder: Wences Casares
- CEO: Wences Casares
- Industry: Mobile wallet
- Services: Freemium Lemon Wallet app; Subscription-based Lemon Wallet app
- Website: www.lemon.com
- Advertising: No
- Registration: Required
- Launched: June 2012
- Current status: Disabled

Lemon Wallet was a cloud-based digital wallet that allowed users to store digital copies of credit cards, debit cards, reward cards, as well as identification, and other card information. The service was released in July 2011 and the company is based in Palo Alto, California, United States. Wences Casares was the company's CEO.

The Lemon Network platform, launched in July 2013, connected payment information from Lemon Wallet directly to a merchant for payment processing.

In December 2013, Lemon Wallet was acquired by LifeLock.

== Services and products ==
Lemon used OCR technology to store and organize users' information from various cards (IDs, health insurance, credit, debit, rewards, etc.) and receipts. An upgraded version allowed users to monitor bank accounts and includes expanded security features such as credit card balance monitoring, alerts for questionable charges, card expiration reminders, and the ability to cancel and restore cards. Lemon also allowed users to store receipt data. The service also organized expense reports (using receipt data), which could be accessed from the web application or mobile device. This data could also be used to submit expense reports. A freemium version of the service was available, as well as a paid subscription. The Lemon application was compatible with iOS, Android, and Windows Phone devices.

== History and product developments ==
=== Beta version ===
The company released the beta version of the service as an expense tracking and management service in July 2011. It soft-launched at the TechCrunch Disrupt conference's startup alley in September 2011 and officially launched in October 2011. In February 2012, the company announced it had reached one million users.

=== Lemon Wallet App ===
Lemon received $8 million in a funding round led by Maveron in May 2012. Other investors in the Series A round included Lightspeed Venture Partners, Draper Fisher Jurvetson, CampVentures, and Social+Capital Partnership. The round followed Lemon's release of the Lemon Wallet app, a service designed to store credit, debit, health insurance, and ID card information using the same photo system the company utilized for expense management. The extended capabilities allowed users to back up everything in their wallet using Lemon's cloud-based, PIN protected database. The app's security features include a 256-bit encryption, as well as the ability for the user to remote-wipe sensitive information if the mobile device is lost or stolen.

Beginning in September 2012, Lemon customers could access cards stored in their Lemon account through Apple's Passbook service.

=== Application upgrade ===
In May 2013, Lemon announced an upgraded expense reporting tool. The enhancement to the Lemon Wallet granted users the ability to have their receipts and e-receipts processed through lemon.com and saved as a PDF copy and a CSV or XLS format copy to be compatible with other expense software. Lemon CEO Wences Casares has reported that as of May 2013, the digital wallet service is capturing and storing approximately 1,000 new cards every hour.

On December 12, 2013, it was announced that LifeLock, a provider of identity theft protection services, acquired Lemon.

=== Security issues ===
On May 16, 2014, LifeLock, Inc. announced that it had temporarily disabled the mobile application due to a security flaw. Despite there being no evidence that user information had been compromised, LifeLock deleted all data stored by current users. Previously, LifeLock was fined $12 million for "deceptive business practices and for failing to secure sensitive customer data".
