= Cecilia Rikap =

Argentine economist

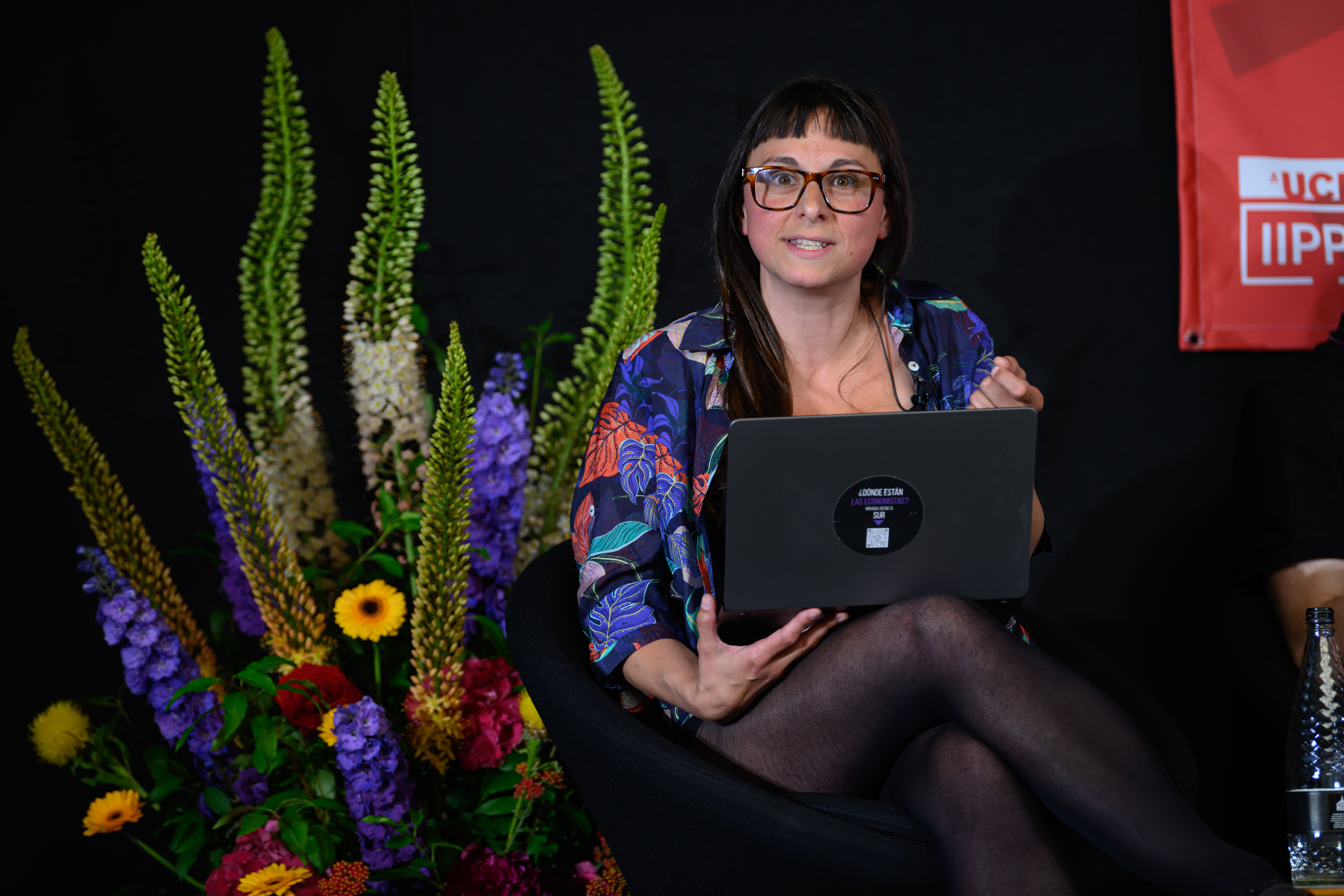
- Cecilia Rikap in 2025
- Born: 1984 (age 41–42); Argentina
- Education: Universidad de Buenos Aires (PhD in Economics)
- Scientific career
- Fields: Digital governance Digital capitalism Intellectual monopolization
- Workplaces: University College London

Cecilia Rikap (born in 1984) is an Argentine academic. She is an economics professor and the head of research at UCL Institute for Innovation and Public Purpose (IIPP) at University College London. Rikap is also a researcher at the CONICET, Argentina’s national research council and a researcher at University of Technology of Compiègne. She advised the Brazilian government on digital strategy.

== Academic research ==
Rikap’s academic work has brought in to focus the concentration of intangible assets in the hands of a few large digital companies. Through her work she has coined the term “intellectual monopolies” to designate this concentration of digital infrastructure, information and data. Rikap’s work informs policy discussions on the artificial intelligence arms race between the US and China. Rikap studied the numerous ways in which Big Tech gains influence over innovation. This includes research to obtain sustainable energy sources for AI, where Google, Microsoft and Amazon distribute so-called cloud credits to innovators, creating a lasting dependency of smaller companies on Big Tech.

== Public cloud infrastructure ==
Rikap called out the dominance of Amazon, Microsoft and Google in the cloud and the ubiquity of Microsoft and Google in AI technology. She advocated for the development of a public cloud infrastructure as a response to the dependence on large technology monopolies. Rikap advised in favor of a public cloud infrastructure financed by the State both in Brazil and in the EU.

== Advising public institutions ==
Rikap campaigned for support among economists for the decision by the Brazilian governments to resist pressure of Big Tech. She coordinated a joint letter signed by 50 prominent economists expressing concern about the interference by large tech companies in Brazil's sovereign matters. She is advising the Brazilian government on digital sovereignty. In 2022 and 2023, Rikap acted as advisor to the Ministry of Health of Argentina. Rikap is a frequent contributor and speaker at the OECD, especially on questions of competition policy.

== Awards ==
Rikap is a recipient of the EAEPE Joan Robinson Prize for her book Capitalism, Power and Innovation: Intellectual Monopoly Capitalism Uncovered.

== Books ==
- Rikap, Cecilia (2021). Capitalism, Power and Innovation Intellectual Monopoly Capitalism Uncovered. Routledge. ISBN 978-0-367-75029-9.
- Rikap, Cecilia; Lundvall, Bengt-Åke (2021). The Digital Innovation Race: Conceptualizing the Emerging New World Order. Palgrave. ISBN 978-3-030-89443-6.
- Rikap, Cecilia (August 4, 2026). The Rulers: Corporate Power in the Age of AI and the Cloud. Verso Books. ISBN 9781804297346.
