= Matt Clifford =

British entrepreneur

Matthew Philip Clifford CBE
- Born: November 1985 (age 40)
- Occupation: Entrepreneur
- Known for: Entrepreneur First and Code First Girls co-founder
- Website: www.matthewclifford.com

Matthew Philip Clifford CBE (born 1985) is a British entrepreneur. Along with Alice Bentinck, he is the co-founder of Entrepreneurs First, an international talent investor and startup accelerator founded in 2011. He is the chair of the UK's Advanced Research and Invention Agency (ARIA).

In the spring of 2023, Clifford helped design the Frontier AI Task Force, which later became the United Kingdom's AI Safety Institute. In August 2023, Clifford was appointed to lead the preparatory work for the 2023 AI Safety Summit, along with the UK's former Deputy National Security Adviser Jonathan Black.

In December 2023, it was announced that Alice Bentinck would take over as CEO of Entrepreneurs First after Clifford stepped down from the role to concentrate on opportunities in artificial intelligence.

In July 2024, Clifford announced he would lead a review of AI opportunities for the new British Labour Government. Following the publication of the AI Opportunities Action Plan in January 2025, Clifford was appointed the Prime Minister’s Adviser on AI in 10 Downing Street, a role from which he decided to step down in June 2025 for family reasons. Clifford's report recommended the creation of a Sovereign AI fund to develop UK AI companies. Beneficiaries of the fund include Callosum, set up with funding from Clifford's venture capital fund Entrepreneurs First. Calossum has also received funding and access to AI labs from ARIA.

In March 2026, Entrepreneurs First raised $200 million in new capital at a reported valuation of $1.3 billion. By then, companies formed through EF were collectively valued at more than $16 billion, and the company had increased its focus on helping funded founders build and raise in San Francisco.

In September 2026 it was announced that Clifford has been hired by Anthropic but will keep his ARIA role
