= Matt Cohler =

American venture capitalist

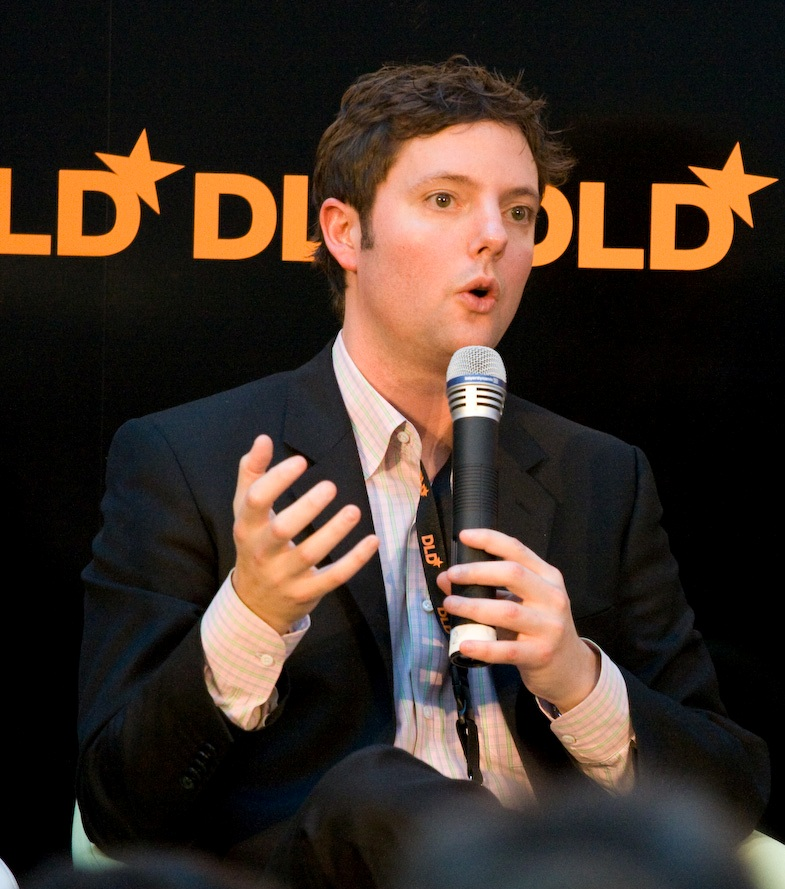
- Matt Cohler, January 2008
- Born: March 27, 1977 (age 49); New York City, US
- Education: Yale University
- Occupation: Venture Capitalist
- Employer: General Partner at Benchmark
- Known for: Former VP of Product Management, Facebook
- Spouse: Pia Pernille Øien Cohler

Matt Cohler (born March 27, 1977) is an American venture capitalist. He worked as Vice President of Product Management for Facebook until June 2008 and was formerly a general partner at Benchmark. Cohler has been named to the Forbes Midas List of top technology investors and in 2019 was named to the New York Times and CB Insights list of top 10 venture capital investors. Cohler made the Forbes 'America's 40 Richest Entrepreneurs Under 40' list in 2015.

== Education and early career ==
Cohler earned a B.A. with honors and distinction in music from Yale University.

Early in his career, Cohler worked in China and was a management consultant at McKinsey & Company. He befriended Reid Hoffman and went on to become a founding member of Hoffman's startup LinkedIn. Cohler was vice president and general manager at LinkedIn and was considered CEO Hoffman's right-hand man.

Cohler was one of the first five employees hired at Facebook. He was Facebook's vice president of product management and worked with the team during many of its critical growth phases. He continued to act as a "special advisor" to Facebook CEO Mark Zuckerberg. In 2008, he left Facebook and became the youngest general partner at Benchmark.

== Benchmark ==
At Benchmark, Cohler has backed the firm's investments in Dropbox, Asana, Quora, Greenhouse, Domo, Tinder, Duo Security, DeepL, Edmodo, ResearchGate, 1stdibs, Peixe Urbano, CouchSurfing, Baixing, and Zendesk. In 2011, he led a $7 million round of funding for Instagram, which agreed in April 2012 to be acquired by Facebook for $1 billion. In March 2014, Cohler led Benchmark's investment in Xapo, a Bitcoin wallet/insured cold storage vault.

In 2010, Cohler sat on the boards of Asana, Quora, ResearchGate, and 1stdibs.

In 2018, it was announced that Cohler would "step back" from Benchmark and not be a part of their next fund. Although he departed the Benchmark fund, he was expected to continue to hold his board seats, including at Uber. Cohler later left the Uber board in July 2019, at the same time as Arianna Huffington.

== Additional affiliations ==
Cohler is vice president of the San Francisco Symphony board of governors, board trustee at Environmental Defense Fund, and a member of the endowment investment committees at Chan Zuckerberg Initiative and the Yale Investments Office.

== Politics ==
In April 2013, a lobbying group called FWD.us (aimed at lobbying for immigration reform and improvements to education) was launched, with Cohler listed as one of the founders.
