= Arc Institute =

American biomedical research nonprofit

- Arc Research Institute

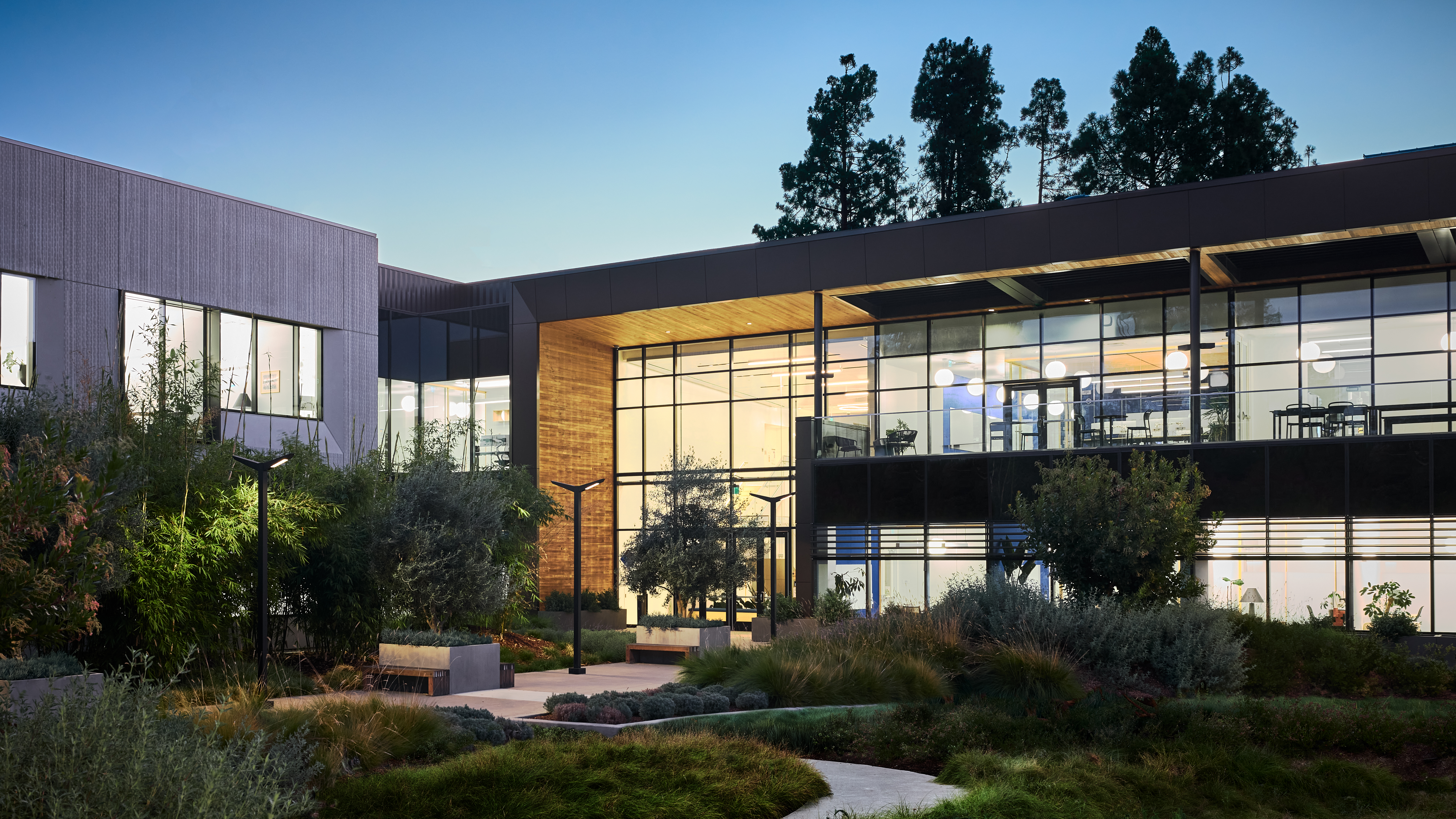
- Arc Institute headquarters in 2024
- Established: 2021; 5 years ago
- Research type: Biomedical research
- Budget: $82.8 million (2024)
- Executive Director: Silvana Konermann
- Faculty: 14
- Location: Stanford Research Park, Palo Alto, California, 94304, U.S. 37.4085°N 122.1485°W
- Affiliations: Stanford University; UC Berkeley; UCSF
- Website: arcinstitute.org

Arc Institute is a nonprofit biomedical research organization based in Palo Alto, California. It was founded by Stanford University biochemistry professor Silvana Konermann, UC Berkeley bioengineering professor Patrick Hsu, and Stripe CEO Patrick Collison, with Konermann as its inaugural executive director. The institute operates in partnership with three San Francisco Bay Area research universities—Stanford, UC Berkeley, and UCSF.

== History ==
Arc Institute was founded in 2021 to provide scientists with research opportunities without the need for external grant applications. This followed a collaboration between Konermann, Hsu, and Collison on Fast Grants during the COVID-19 pandemic.

Arc Institute was launched with initial funding commitments of $650 million. Founding donors include Ethereum creator Vitalik Buterin, Stripe co-founders Patrick Collison and John Collison, angel investor Ron Conway, Color Genomics co-founder Elad Gil, Cue co-founder Daniel Gross, Facebook and Asana co-founder Dustin Moskovitz, Coefficient Giving chair Cari Tuna, General Catalyst CEO Hemant Taneja, and Jane Street Capital executives. Silvana Konermann is the executive director, and Patrick Hsu leads the development of research teams focused on technology related to biological research. Both Konermann and Hsu lead research labs in addition to their other roles at the institute.

Arc Institute's 100,000 sq. ft. research facility in Stanford Research Park was designed by Mark Cavagnero Associates and won the 2025 Chicago Athenaeum American Architecture Award. Carolyn Bertozzi and Aviv Regev serve on the institute's scientific advisory board, and Nat Friedman, Reid Hoffman, and Susan Li serve on its board of directors. Dave Burke, former Vice President of Engineering for Google’s Android division, was named Arc's CTO in 2024. Burke left the role in 2026 and was replaced by Usman Muzaffar, former Senior Vice President of Engineering at Cloudflare. Megan van Overbeek, former Vice President of Preclinical Research at Metagenomi Therapeutics, was named Arc's CSO in 2026.

== Funding structure ==
Funding focuses on "high risk, high reward" science, with flexible funding modeled after organizations like the Broad Institute, Howard Hughes Medical Institute and Chan Zuckerberg Biohub. The institute's three main funding categories are Core Investigators, Innovation Investigators, and Ignite Awards.

Arc core investigators work within the institute itself, and are given a budget to support a lab of up to 20 people and full funding for eight years of laboratory operations. The institute also has technology development centers focusing on machine learning, genome engineering, cellular and animal models of human disease, and multiomics.

Arc Innovation Investigators receive $1 million over five years, while Ignite Awards grant researchers from the three partner universities $100,000 for one year.

== Research ==
Arc Institute's stated mission is to "accelerate scientific progress, understand the root causes of complex diseases, and narrow the gap between discoveries and impact on patients". The institute brings together researchers from varied backgrounds to facilitate collaboration between biologists doing experimental research and researchers creating new technology.

In 2024, Patrick Hsu and collaborators developed a new method of genetic engineering called "bridge RNA" with potential advantages in simplicity and precision compared to CRISPR. The research was described in two papers published back-to-back in Nature in 2024.

Also in 2024, Arc researchers led by Hsu and Brian Hie released a large language model trained on biological sequence data. Called "Evo", the model uses deep learning to interpret DNA sequences at single-nucleotide resolution and design biological systems such as CRISPR-Cas complexes and transposable elements. Evo was published in Science and received recognition from The New York Times in its 2024 "Good Tech Awards".

In January 2025, Arc announced a partnership with Nvidia to integrate biology and machine learning. In April 2025, Arc announced a partnership with 10x Genomics and Ultima Genomics to create a curated atlas of single-cell data for building virtual cell models.
