= Fast Grants =

Research charity in the United States

Fast Grants was a charitable initiative administered by the Mercatus Center that distributed funding for COVID-19-related research during the COVID-19 pandemic.

== History ==
Fast Grants was launched in April 2020 by Tyler Cowen, director of the Mercatus Center and economics professor at George Mason University; Patrick Collison, co-founder and CEO of online payment processing platform Stripe; and Patrick Hsu, a bioengineering professor at the University of California, Berkeley, with the stated purpose of providing funding to researchers more quickly than traditional science funding mechanisms.

== Support ==
The project was supported by donations from Arnold Ventures, The Audacious Project, The Chan Zuckerberg Initiative, John Collison, Patrick Collison, Crankstart, Jack Dorsey, Kim and Scott Farquhar, Paul Graham, Reid Hoffman, Fiona McKean and Tobias Lütke, Yuri and Julia Milner, Elon Musk, Crystal and Chris Sacca, Schmidt Futures, and others.

== Grants ==
Fast Grants provided funding of $10,000-$500,000 per project and aimed to respond to grant applications within two weeks.

As of April 2021, Fast Grants had awarded 250 grants totaling more than $50 million to researchers working on COVID-19 related projects, including testing, clinical work, surveillance, virology, drug development and trials, and PPE. Fast Grants provided initial funding for SalivaDirect, the saliva test used in the NBA “bubble” in Orlando during the 2020 season. Other notable grant recipients included Addgene, the Center for Open Science, Susan Athey, Carolyn Bertozzi, Catherine Blish, Pamela Bjorkman, Susan Daniel, Barbara Engelhardt, Laura Esserman, Judith Frydman, Amy Gladfelter, Eva Harris, Akiko Iwasaki, Kevin Kain, Yoshihiro Kawaoka, Nevan Krogan, Ronald Levy, Allison McGeer, Miriam Merad, Keith Mostov, Mihai Netea, Daniel Nomura, Melanie Ott, Bradley Pentelute, Rosalind Picard, Hidde Ploegh, Angela Rasmussen, Erica Ollmann Saphire, Katherine Seley-Radtke, Erec Stebbins, Alice Ting, Alain Townsend, David Veesler, Bert Vogelstein, Tania Watts, and Qian Zhang.

As of January 2022, Fast Grants was no longer accepting applications.

== Impact ==
The Fast Grants program inspired multiple other well-funded efforts that replicate its low overhead, high impact funding model. Some examples include Norn Group's Impetus Grants for longevity research (>$34M of funding), Robert Downey Jr.'s Footprint Coalition for climate change, and Superalignment Fast Grants from OpenAI for safe AI development ($10M of funding).
