= Anne Wyllie =

New Zealand microbiologist and epidemiologist

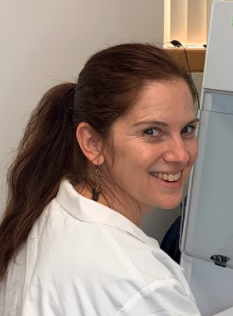
- Wyllie in 2021
- Born: Anne Louise Wyllie; 1985 (age 40–41); Auckland, New Zealand
- Other name: The Spit Queen
- Education: University of Auckland; Utrecht University
- Known for: Developing saliva testing for SARS-CoV-2
- Awards: COVID-19 Research Award (Yale School of Public Health)
- Scientific career
- Fields: Epidemiology of microbial diseases
- Workplaces: Yale School of Public Health; Pfizer
- Thesis: Molecular surveillance of pneumococcal carriage in all ages (2016)
- Doctoral advisor: Elisabeth Sanders; Krzystof Trzcinski

Anne Louise Wyllie (born 1985) is a New Zealand microbiologist who was the lead author of a 2020 research article which led to the development of the SalivaDirect PCR method of testing saliva for SARS-CoV-2, the virus that causes COVID-19. She has also worked on community studies to better understand pneumococcal disease. She is a research scientist in epidemiology.

== Early life and education ==
Wyllie studied at Northcote College in Auckland. She completed a BSc in Biomedical Science at the University of Auckland in 2007, followed by a Postgraduate Diploma, and Masters in Medical Science in 2009 at the Auckland Cancer Society Research Centre (University of Auckland), with a dissertation entitled In vitro studies of the anti-tumour agent DMXAA. Wyllie completed a PhD in medical microbiology in 2016 at Utrecht University, with a dissertation entitled Molecular surveillance of pneumococcal carriage in all ages. Since early 2020, she worked as a research scientist in the Department of Epidemiology of Microbial Diseases at the Yale School of Public Health at Yale University. She now works at Pfizer.

== Saliva testing research ==
Wyllie began working on the use of saliva as a sample source to improve the detection of the pneumococcus bacteria in community settings in 2011.

In early 2020, at the start of the COVID-19 pandemic, Wyllie joined the Yale IMPACT Covid responses where they encountered a collapse of the supply chain for nasopharyngeal swabs, as well as hesitancy by both patients and healthcare staff to perform swabbing. This prompted her to advocate the validation of saliva testing for SARS-CoV-2. Wyllie wanted to develop a saliva test for SARS-CoV-2 but was hampered by a lack of funding.

By April 2020, Wyllie and her colleagues had demonstrated that saliva could be a sensitive and reliable sample for SARS-CoV-2 detection. Wyllie and her team compared side-by-side samples of "gold standard" nasopharyngeal swabs and saliva samples. They discovered that saliva samples could be just as reliable. They also found asymptomatic individuals were testing positive in saliva samples several days before the nasopharyngeal swabs would be positive; however, Wyllie wanted to further develop saliva as a sample type to enable frequent, repeat testing and to drive down testing costs to make testing more accessible. During the spring of 2020, Wyllie and others in Nathan Grubaugh's lab developed a test called SalivaDirect, described as simpler, cheaper, and less invasive than nasopharyngeal testing. The SalivaDirect test collects saliva in a tube without requiring a swab and thus does not require collection by healthcare workers. It also does not involve RNA extraction, allowing direct PCR testing of samples, and cutting the time required to process samples as well as the expense of testing. Removing the RNA extraction from the process also allows a wider range of laboratories to engage in saliva testing than nasopharyngeal testing.

In April 2020, Wyllie, as lead author, submitted a paper to The New England Journal of Medicine describing the team's research; it was published in August 2020.

This work sparked interest from the NBA which was keen to pursue saliva-testing as a means to run a season more safely. Funding from the NBA supported the development, validation, and optimization of SalivaDirect while providing a test population to validate the test for use in asymptomatic people. The SalivaDirect test received FDA emergency use authorization in August 2020, allowing for its nationwide rollout. Through the Fast Grant, part of the Emergent Ventures scheme set up by economist Tyler Cowen, she was able to raise an additional $500,000 to support the further development of the test and to support local testing efforts. For her efforts, Wyllie was dubbed the "Spit Queen" in an interview on NPR.

In August 2021, Wyllie wrote to New Zealand prime minister Jacinda Ardern to express her concerns over the slow rollout of saliva testing in New Zealand, when other countries had been saliva-testing widely for over a year. She was also critical of the method used to validate the saliva test conducted by Asia Pacific Healthcare Group (APHG) in New Zealand, saying that APHG was using methods that were not widely used overseas. In September 2021, Wyllie said in an interview on Radio New Zealand that the New Zealand government had been "badly advised" with respect to saliva testing. In response, Anoop Singh, the chief executive of APHG, questioned Wyllie's qualifications and the relevance of her research, and claimed that saliva samples could be tested in the same way as nasopharyngeal swabs (i.e. with RNA extraction). Singh was reported as saying, "Sorry who is Anne Wyllie? Who is Anne Wyllie? She's a research scientist sitting in the US on some university campus. How is she qualified?" Singh's comments led to a social media backlash, including the creation of Wyllie's English Wikipedia page.

APHG was contracted by the New Zealand Ministry of Health to deliver saliva testing beginning in May 2021, but the programme did not begin until August. Singh blamed the delay between contracting and roll-out on the Ministry of Health.

Wyllie represented the Yale School of Public Health at the September 2021 Global COVID-19 Summit hosted by president Joe Biden.

== Honours and awards ==
Wyllie received a Medal of Excellence from the Northcote College Board of Trustees in 2020. She also received the COVID-19 Research Award from the Yale School of Public Health in 2021.

== Selected publications ==
- Eli P. Fenichel; R. Tobias Koch; Anna Gilbert; Gregg Gonsalves; Anne L. Wyllie (3 September 2021). "Understanding the Barriers to Pooled SARS-CoV-2 Testing in the United States". Microbiology Spectrum. 9 (1). doi:10.1128/spectrum.00312-21. ISSN 2165-0497. PMID 34378949. Wikidata Q108912045.
- Elisa Borghi; Valentina Massa; Gianvincenzo Zuccotti; Anne L Wyllie (12 July 2021). "Testing Saliva to Reveal the Submerged Cases of the COVID-19 Iceberg". Frontiers in Microbiology. 12 721635. doi:10.3389/fmicb.2021.721635. ISSN 1664-302X. PMC 8312273. PMID 34322114. Wikidata Q108525390.
- Steph H Tan; Orchid Allicock; Mari Armstrong-Hough; Anne L Wyllie (June 2021). "Saliva as a gold-standard sample for SARS-CoV-2 detection". The Lancet. Respiratory medicine. 9 (6): 562–564. doi:10.1016/s2213-2600(21)00178-8. ISSN 2213-2600. PMC 8055204. PMID 33887248. Wikidata Q108525299.
- Anne L Wyllie; Joshua L Warren; Gili Regev-Yochay; Noga Givon-Lavi; Ron Dagan; Daniel M Weinberger (29 September 2020). "Serotype patterns of pneumococcal disease in adults are correlated with carriage patterns in older children". Clinical Infectious Diseases. doi:10.1093/cid/ciaa1480. ISSN 1058-4838. PMC 8315131. PMID 32989457. Wikidata Q100316936.
- Anne L Wyllie; John Fournier; Arnau Casanovas-Massana; et al. (28 August 2020). "Saliva or Nasopharyngeal Swab Specimens for Detection of SARS-CoV-2". The New England Journal of Medicine. doi:10.1056/nejmc2016359. ISSN 0028-4793. PMID 32857487. Wikidata Q98781368.
- Chantal B. Vogels; Anderson F Brito; Anne L Wyllie; et al. (10 July 2020). "Analytical sensitivity and efficiency comparisons of SARS-CoV-2 RT-qPCR primer-probe sets". Nature Microbiology. doi:10.1038/s41564-020-0761-6. ISSN 2058-5276. PMID 32651556. Wikidata Q97531551.
- Anne Wyllie; Yvonne Pannekoek; Sandra Bovenkerk; et al. (1 September 2017). "Sequencing of the variable region of rpsB to discriminate between Streptococcus pneumoniae and other streptococcal species". Open Biology. 7 (9). doi:10.1098/rsob.170074. ISSN 2046-2441. PMC 5627049. PMID 28931649. Wikidata Q41995884.
- Anne L Wyllie; Lidewij W Rümke; Kayleigh Arp; et al. (7 October 2016). "Molecular surveillance on Streptococcus pneumoniae carriage in non-elderly adults; little evidence for pneumococcal circulation independent from the reservoir in children". Scientific Reports. 6 34888. doi:10.1038/srep34888. ISSN 2045-2322. PMC 5054371. PMID 27713565. Wikidata Q37319027.
- Wouter A de Steenhuijsen Piters; Elisabeth G W Huijskens; Anne L Wyllie; et al. (7 July 2015). "Dysbiosis of upper respiratory tract microbiota in elderly pneumonia patients". The ISME Journal. 10 (1): 97–108. doi:10.1038/ismej.2015.99. ISSN 1751-7362. PMC 4681870. PMID 26151645. Wikidata Q35685214.
- Cassandra L Krone; Anne L Wyllie; Josine van Beek; et al. (19 March 2015). "Carriage of Streptococcus pneumoniae in aged adults with influenza-like-illness". PLOS One. 10 (3) e0119875. Bibcode:2015PLoSO..1019875K. doi:10.1371/journal.pone.0119875. ISSN 1932-6203. PMC 4366201. PMID 25789854. Wikidata Q35196038.
- Anne L Wyllie; Mei Ling J N Chu; Mariëlle H B Schellens; et al. (11 July 2014). "Streptococcus pneumoniae in saliva of Dutch primary school children". PLOS One. 9 (7) e102045. Bibcode:2014PLoSO...9j2045W. doi:10.1371/journal.pone.0102045. ISSN 1932-6203. PMC 4094488. PMID 25013895. Wikidata Q33889880.
- Krzysztof Trzciński; Debby Bogaert; Anne Wyllie; et al. (28 March 2013). "Superiority of trans-oral over trans-nasal sampling in detecting Streptococcus pneumoniae colonization in adults". PLOS One. 8 (3) e60520. Bibcode:2013PLoSO...860520T. doi:10.1371/journal.pone.0060520. ISSN 1932-6203. PMC 3610877. PMID 23555985. Wikidata Q34654025.
