= Patrick Hsu =

American bioengineer and molecular biologist

Patrick D. Hsu
- Born: Patrick David Hsu; 1993 (age 32–33); Taipei, Taiwan
- Citizenship: United States
- Education: University of California, Berkeley (BS); Harvard University (MA, PhD)
- Known for: CRISPR, machine learning, synthetic biology, gene therapy
- Awards: Rainwater Prize; MIT Technology Review Innovators Under 35; Amgen Young Investigator Award; NIH Early Independence Award
- Scientific career
- Fields: Bioengineering, Gene editing, Synthetic biology, Machine learning
- Workplaces: Stanford University, Arc Institute
- Thesis: Genome engineering and RNA-guided systems (2014)
- Doctoral advisor: Feng Zhang
- Website: Hsu Lab

Patrick D. Hsu (born 1993) is an American bioengineer, entrepreneur, and investor specializing in CRISPR, machine learning, synthetic biology, and gene therapy. He is an assistant professor of pathology at Stanford University and a co-founder of Arc Institute, a research organization focused on accelerating biomedical discovery. He is a member of the board of directors of Notion and the scientific advisory board of Amgen.

== Biography ==
Hsu earned his bachelor's degree in bioengineering from the University of California, Berkeley. He then completed his PhD at Harvard University under the mentorship of Feng Zhang at the Broad Institute of MIT and Harvard, where he worked on early CRISPR-based gene-editing technologies, including one of the first demonstrations of Cas9 human genome engineering.

After completing his doctorate at age 21, Hsu led early stage discovery projects at Editas Medicine. At 23, he established his independent research group as a Salk Fellow at the Salk Institute for Biological Studies, where he developed CRISPR-Cas13 systems for transcriptome engineering. In 2020, he joined the bioengineering faculty at the University of California, Berkeley. In 2026, he left UC Berkeley and joined the pathology department faculty at the Stanford University School of Medicine. His lab, located at Arc Institute, focuses on AI foundation models for biology and developing gene editing technologies. His research has over 65,000 citations, according to Google Scholar.

In 2020, he helped start Fast Grants to provide funding to scientists working on research projects that could help with the COVID-19 pandemic. Along with Stanford University professor Silvana Konermann and Stripe CEO Patrick Collison, Hsu is a co-founder of Arc Institute, a nonprofit research organization focused on accelerating discoveries in biology and medicine.

== Achievements and recognition ==
Hsu was named to the MIT Technology Review Innovators Under 35 list in 2017. He was included in Forbes 30 Under 30 in Science in 2015 for his contributions to CRISPR technology. His lab's discovery of programmable recombinases was named among the 5 Important Medical Breakthroughs of 2024 by Forbes, and genomic language models developed by Arc scientists were named one of The Most Important Breakthroughs of 2024 by The Atlantic.

== Research ==
Hsu's research focuses on using artificial intelligence (AI) to advance biology as well as the development of genome editing technologies such as recombinases and CRISPR. This includes using AI to advance cell-based models. His work has contributed to:

- DNA foundation models that enable biological sequence modeling and design across molecular contexts and modalities, published on the cover of Science in November 2024.
- AI-driven gene editing, where computational models are used to design new gene editors that surpass naturally occurring enzymes.
- Bridge RNAs for programmable recombination, which allow for precise DNA modifications without traditional genome-editing tools. In 2025, his research group reported in Science the ability to manipulate up to 1 million bases of the human genome.
- "Jumping gene" enzymes, which enable DNA insertion and deletion without using CRISPR, a novel approach published in Nature in 2024.
- CRISPR-based DNA and RNA-targeting technologies, establishing widely used tools for genome editing.

== Commercial interests ==
Hsu is a co-founder of Stylus Medicine, a biotechnology company that raised $85 million in 2025 to commercialize gene insertion technology developed in his lab, and of Terrain Biosciences, a startup leveraging AI models and technologies for designing and manufacturing RNA.

Since September 2025, Hsu has been a Venture Partner with Thrive Capital. Hsu's investments as an angel investor include Varda Space Industries and Cradle Bio.

As of 2026, Hsu serves on the board of directors of Notion and the scientific advisory board of Amgen.
