= Daughter of Time =

Daughter of Time may refer to:

- Daughter of Time (album), 1970 album by Colosseum
- Daughter of Time Trilogy, omnibus of the novels Reader, Writer, and Maker by Erec Stebbins
- The Daughter of Time, 1951 novel by Josephine Tey
