= Takashi Negishi =

Japanese economist

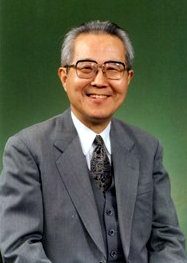
- Takashi Negishi
- Born: April 2, 1933 (age 93); Tokyo, Japan

Academic background
- Education: University of Tokyo
- Influences: Kenneth J. Arrow

Academic work
- Discipline: Microeconomics; General equilibrium theory History of economic thought
- School or tradition: Neo-Walrasian economics
- Institutions: Toyo Eiwa University; Aoyama Gakuin University; University of Tokyo
- Awards: Japan Academy Prize (1993); Order of Culture (2014)

Takashi Negishi (根岸隆, Negishi Takashi; born 2 April 1933) is a Japanese neo-Walrasian economist.

== Career ==
Negishi graduated from the Faculty of Economics, University of Tokyo in 1956 and received a PhD in Economics from the University of Tokyo in 1963.

== Contributions ==
Negishi's research has provided a wide range of extensions to orthodox general equilibrium modelling. These additions have typically involved imperfect competition, stability and unemployment.

== Controversy ==
Negishi is most famous for Negishi welfare weights or Negishi social welfare function, a system of weighting welfare assessment used in the Kyoto Protocol and other macro-economic analyses. These are controversial insofar as they recognize and embed into economic analysis a varying and unequal price of life across different countries. Elizabeth A. Stanton specifically criticized this approach in Negishi Welfare Weights: The Mathematics of Global Inequality, 2011, arguing in an interview that:

"…Negishi weighting is a key ethical assumption at work in climate-economics models, but one that is virtually unknown to most model users. Negishi weights freeze the current distribution of income between world regions; without this constraint, IAMs that maximize global welfare would recommend an equalization of income across regions as part of their policy advice. With Negishi weights in place, these models instead recommend a course of action that would be optimal only in a world in which global income redistribution cannot and will not take place" at any rate whatsoever.

This is argued by Stanton and others to be both inequitable and inaccurate, as over time that "current distribution" would change, making the policy advice even more wrong than it was when it was decided.

Joshua K. Abbott and Eli Fenichel acknowledged that

"Negishi weights are often criticized on ethical grounds. [But] We show the Negishi SWF is ethically consistent with the Golden Rule, whereby the social planner weights others’ utilities at a point in time as he would weight his own future discounted utility."

However, the assumptions are still those of the planner and not those whose welfare is planned for. An empirical observation that remains unexplained is why the income distribution observed in 1948 by George F. Kennan, when the US had 50% of world wealth (and presumably income) with 6% of its population, remained so similar to the price of life ratio between developed and developing world as of Kyoto in 1990, at about 15 to 1. However, this could not be blamed easily on Negishi.

== Festschrift ==
- Ikeo, A., & Kurz, H.-D. (2009). A history of economic theory: Essays in honour of Takashi Negishi. London: Routledge. ISBN 978-1-134-08145-5.

== Selected publications ==
- Negishi, T. (1960). Welfare economics and existence of an equilibrium for a competitive economy. Metroeconomica, June, 12, 92–97.
- Negishi, Takashi (1962) The Stability of a Competitive Economy: A Survey Article, Econometrica Vol. 30, No. 4, Oct., pp. 635–669
- Negishi, Takashi, (1979) Microeconomic Foundations of Keynesian Macroeconomics, Amsterdam: North-Holland
