= Silvana Konermann =

Swiss-American bioengineer and neuroscientist

- Born: Silvana Maria Konermann; 1988 (age 37–38); Baden, Switzerland
- Education: ETH Zurich (BSc); Massachusetts Institute of Technology (PhD)
- Known for: CRISPRa, CRISPR-Cas13, transcriptome engineering
- Spouse: Patrick Collison (m. 2022)
- Awards: Harold M. Weintraub Graduate Student Award
- Scientific career
- Fields: Bioengineering, Neuroscience
- Workplaces: Stanford University, Arc Institute
- Thesis: Interrogation and control of mammalian transcription (2016)
- Doctoral advisor: Feng Zhang
- Website: Konermann Lab

Silvana Konermann (born 1988) is a Swiss-American bioengineer and neuroscientist whose research focuses on CRISPR, genome engineering, transcription and epigenetics, and Alzheimer's disease. She is an assistant professor of biochemistry at Stanford University and co-founder and executive director of Arc Institute.

Konermann's research laboratory aims to understand the molecular pathways that drive the development of Alzheimer’s disease using next-generation functional genomics, with the long-term goal of developing rationally targeted therapeutics for neurodegenerative disorders.

== Early life and education ==
Silvana Maria Konermann was born in 1988 in Baden, Switzerland, near Zürich. She attended Sächsisches Landesgymnasium Sankt Afra zu Meißen in Saxony, Germany. She won a first-place award at the 2005 European Union Contest for Young Scientists (EUCYS) in Moscow and a second-place award at the 2006 Intel International Science and Engineering Fair (ISEF) in Indianapolis. The minor planet 21546 Konermann was named in her honor by MIT Lincoln Laboratory through its Ceres Connection program. She received her Bachelor's degree in neurobiology from ETH Zurich in 2009.

Konermann spent a year as a visiting master's student in Carlos Lois's lab at the Massachusetts Institute of Technology (MIT) before entering the MIT Brain and Cognitive Sciences PhD program in 2010. She joined Feng Zhang's lab at the Broad Institute and McGovern Institute for Brain Research as one of Zhang's first graduate students. During her PhD, Konermann contributed to the development of pioneering genetic perturbation technologies, including one of the first systems for genome-scale CRISPR activation. She completed her PhD in neuroscience in 2016, receiving the Harold M. Weintraub Graduate Student Award for "outstanding achievement during graduate studies in the biological sciences."

== Career ==
As a postdoctoral fellow at the Salk Institute, Konermann was part of the team that discovered Cas13d, a new subclass of compact RNA-targeting CRISPR effectors. She was named an HHMI Hanna H. Gray Fellow in 2017 and a CZ Biohub investigator in 2019. In October 2019, Konermann joined Stanford as an assistant professor of biochemistry.

Along with UC Berkeley professor Patrick Hsu and Stripe CEO Patrick Collison, her husband, she is a co-founder of nonprofit research organization Arc Institute, where she serves as executive director and maintains her research laboratory as a core investigator.

== Personal life ==
In June 2022, Konermann married Irish tech billionaire Patrick Collison, the co-founder and CEO of Stripe. Konermann met Collison at the 2005 European Union Contest for Young Scientists.
