= Extraordinary Retribution =

2013 thriller novel by Erec Stebbins

- Paperback and hardback covers
- Author: Erec Stebbins
- Language: English
- Series: Intel 1
- Genre: Thriller, Political thriller, Conspiracy fiction, Spy fiction
- Publisher: Twice Pi Press
- Publication date: 2013
- Publication place: United States
- Media type: Print (Hardcover, Paperback), ebook(Amazon Kindle, Barnes & Noble Nook)
- Pages: 424 pp (First ed. hardcover)
- ISBN: 978-0-98900048-2
- Followed by: The Anonymous Signal

Extraordinary Retribution is a 2013 thriller novel by biomedical scientist Erec Stebbins, and the second in the Intel 1 Series of thrillers. The novel is about a former special agent who works with the brother of a slain colleague to unravel a series of mysterious assassinations in the CIA. Together, they discover a government coverup of unauthorized extraordinary rendition, torture, and targeted killing while becoming pursued themselves by a killer seeking vengeance to the highest levels of the intelligence community.

== Characters ==
- Sara Houston - Rogue CIA agent investigating killings in her former division.
- Francisco Lopez - Catholic priest working with Sara Houston to bring the killers of his brother to justice.
- The Wraith - A mysterious assassin murdering government agents.
- Fred Simon - Former CIA director and friend of Sara Houston.
- John Savas - An FBI Special Agent in Charge of Intel 1.
- Rebecca Cohen - Lead information specialist at FBI special division Intel 1.

== Reviews ==
Extraordinary Retribution has received mixed reviews. It was called "a whirlwind tour of world politics, interactions, and undercover schemes" by the Midwest Book Review and "an addictive page turner and heart pounding thrill ride" by the Internet Review of Books. Critics labeled it an "amateurish spy revenge thriller" with "clunky prose."

== See also ==
- Erec Stebbins
- The Ragnarök Conspiracy
- Intel 1 Series
