= Castletroy College =

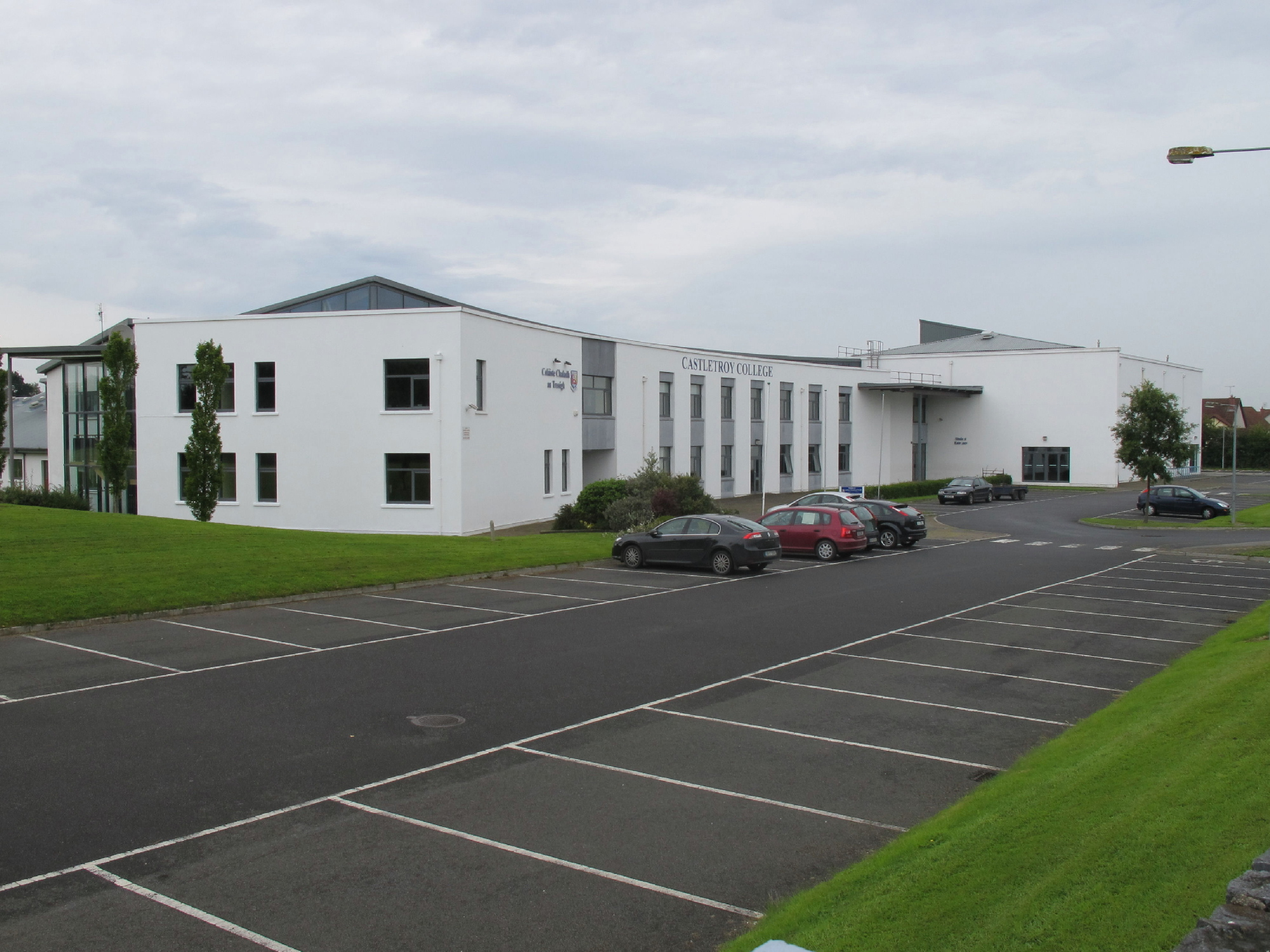
- Castletroy College facade and carpark

Location
- Castletroy
- Coordinates: 52.66313°N 8.54089°W

Information
- Type: Secondary school
- Motto: Ut Sint Unum (That They May Be One)
- Established: 2000
- Principal: Brian O'Donoghue
- Enrollment: c. 1,300 (2025)
- Colours: Teal
- Website: castletroycollege.ie

Castletroy College is a co-educational community school in Newtown, Castletroy, County Limerick, Ireland. It was founded in 2000. As of 2025, it had over 1,300 students enrolled.

== Sport ==
Basketball is played at the school and the girls team have won the Senior Munster Cup final four times in a row and the senior all Ireland three times in a row. The school's girls' soccer team have also been in more than 6 All-Ireland finals, winning several of them.

In March 2008, Castletroy's rugby teams both won the Munster Schools Junior Cup and the Munster Schools Senior Cup. The former Limerick hurler Paudie Fitzmaurice previously taught maths at the school. Competitive swimmer Gráinne Murphy also attended Castletroy College.

== Other activities ==
In 2004, Patrick Collison, a student of the school, won second prize at the EsatBT Young Scientist of the Year Awards. Patrick and his brother John Collison later went on to found the payments company Stripe.

Another student, Galin Ganchev, won several Maths Olympiad medals, including silver medals at the 5th European Union Science Olympiad (2007) and the Irish EU Science Olympiad (2007), a silver medal at the Balkan Maths Olympiad (2008), and was a co-winner of the PRISM Irish National Maths Contest (2007).

In December 2010, a student from the school was awarded a medal from the Institute of Physics for coming joint first in that year's Leaving Certificate Physics examination.

== Notable alumni ==
- John Collison, entrepreneur
- Patrick Collison, entrepreneur
- Eoin Hayes, politician
- Leah McNamara, actress
- Gráinne Murphy, swimmer
- Ronan O'Mahony, rugby player
