= Northcote College =

Secondary school in Auckland, New Zealand

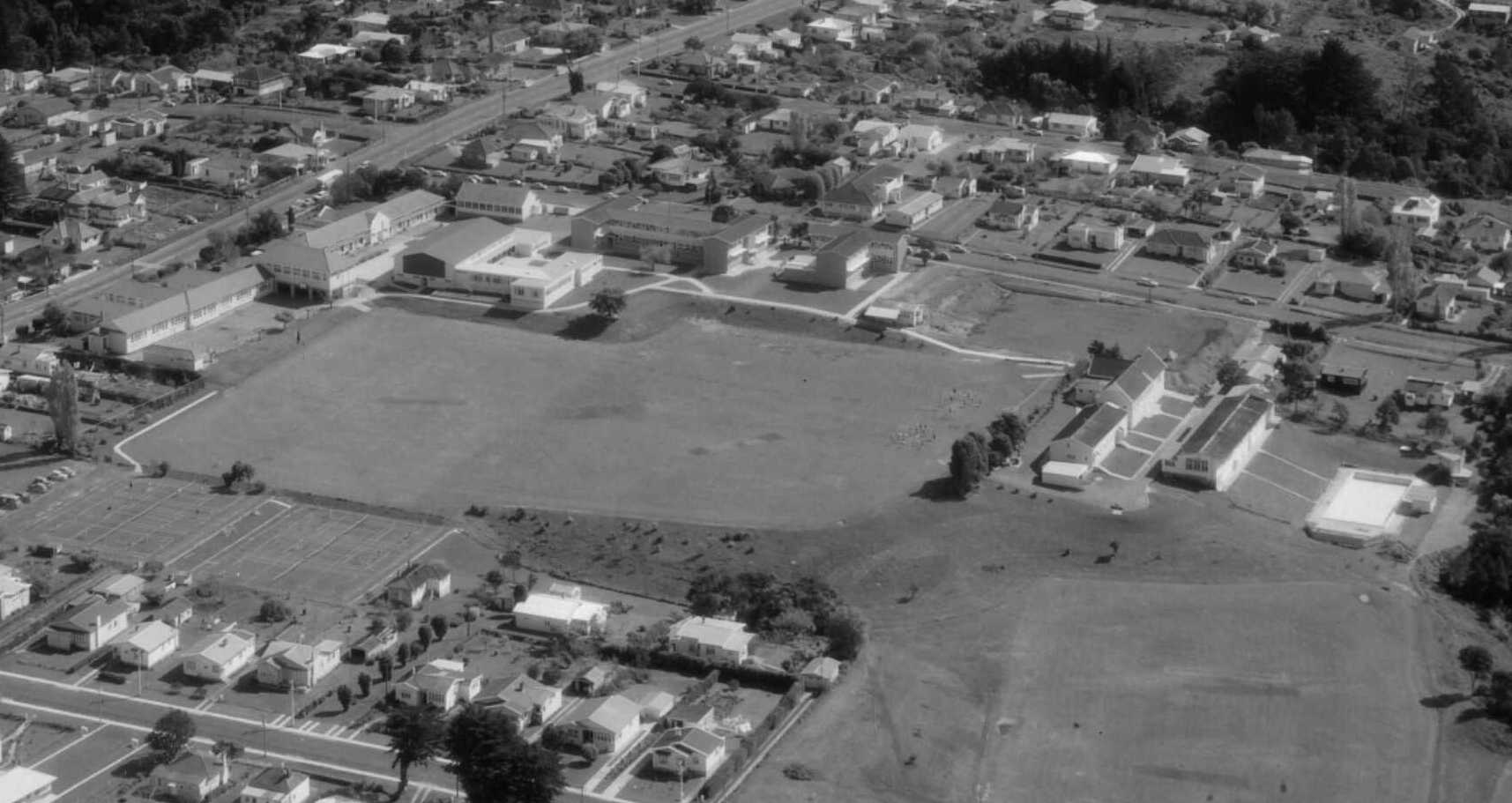
- Aerial view of Northcote College in 1967

Location
- 1 Kauri Glen Rd; Northcote; Auckland 0627; New Zealand; 36.809637°S 174.733762°E

Information
- Type: State Co-educational Secondary (Years 9–13)
- Motto: Ut Prosim Aliis; That I may be of service to others
- Established: 1877
- Ministry of Education Institution no.: 32
- Principal: Vicki Barrie
- Enrolment: 1,616 (March 2026)
- Socio-economic decile: 7O
- Website: www.northcote.school.nz

Northcote College is a New Zealand secondary school for boys and girls (co-educational) located in Northcote, Auckland. The school caters for Form 3 (Year 9) to Form 7 (Year 13). It was founded in 1877 and is the oldest secondary school on the North Shore.

Sporting codes and cultural activities include rugby, football (soccer), drama/performance, jazz band, orchestra, theatre sports and cultural groups. The school rules are based on respect and aimed at encouraging hard work, courtesy and concern for others.

The school's motto is Ut Prosim Aliis | Kia Manaaki te Tangata | That I May Be of Service to Others.

== Enrolment ==
As of March 2026, Northcote College has a roll of 1,616 students, of which 227 (14.0%) identify as Māori.

As of 2026, the school has an Equity Index of 428, placing it amongst schools whose students have few socioeconomic barriers to achievement (roughly equivalent to deciles 8 and 9 under the former socio-economic decile system).

== History ==
In 2014, a fire destroyed three classrooms in the school's technology block.

In February 2026, almost 12 years later, a fire broke out in the college's sports pavilion, a heritage building that had served as the school's original teaching space. The pavilion was part of a $48.5 million redevelopment project announced in 2020, and was located adjacent to a new classroom block that opened in 2026.

== Notable alumni ==
- Steven Ferguson (born 8 May 1980), Olympian, swimming and kayaking
- Arthur Jennings (born 1940), 1967 All Black
- Alexa Johnston, art curator and author
- Kevin Locke (born 4 April 1989), rugby league, Warriors and NZ Kiwis
- Nisha Madhan, actor, director and producer
- Bill Ralston (born 1953), journalist and broadcaster (graduated 1971)
- Mike Rann (born 1953), premier of South Australia (graduated 1970)
- Hollie Smith (born 1982), singer-songwriter
- Nick Williams (born 1983), rugby player North Harbour, Blues
- Martin Winch (1949–2011), guitarist, composer, sound engineer, teacher and mentor
- George Wood (born 1946), Auckland councillor and former Mayor of North Shore City
- Terry Wright (born 1963), All Black 1986–92
- Anne Wyllie, scientist who developed the COVID-19 saliva test
