= Patrick Collison =

Irish entrepreneur (born 1988)

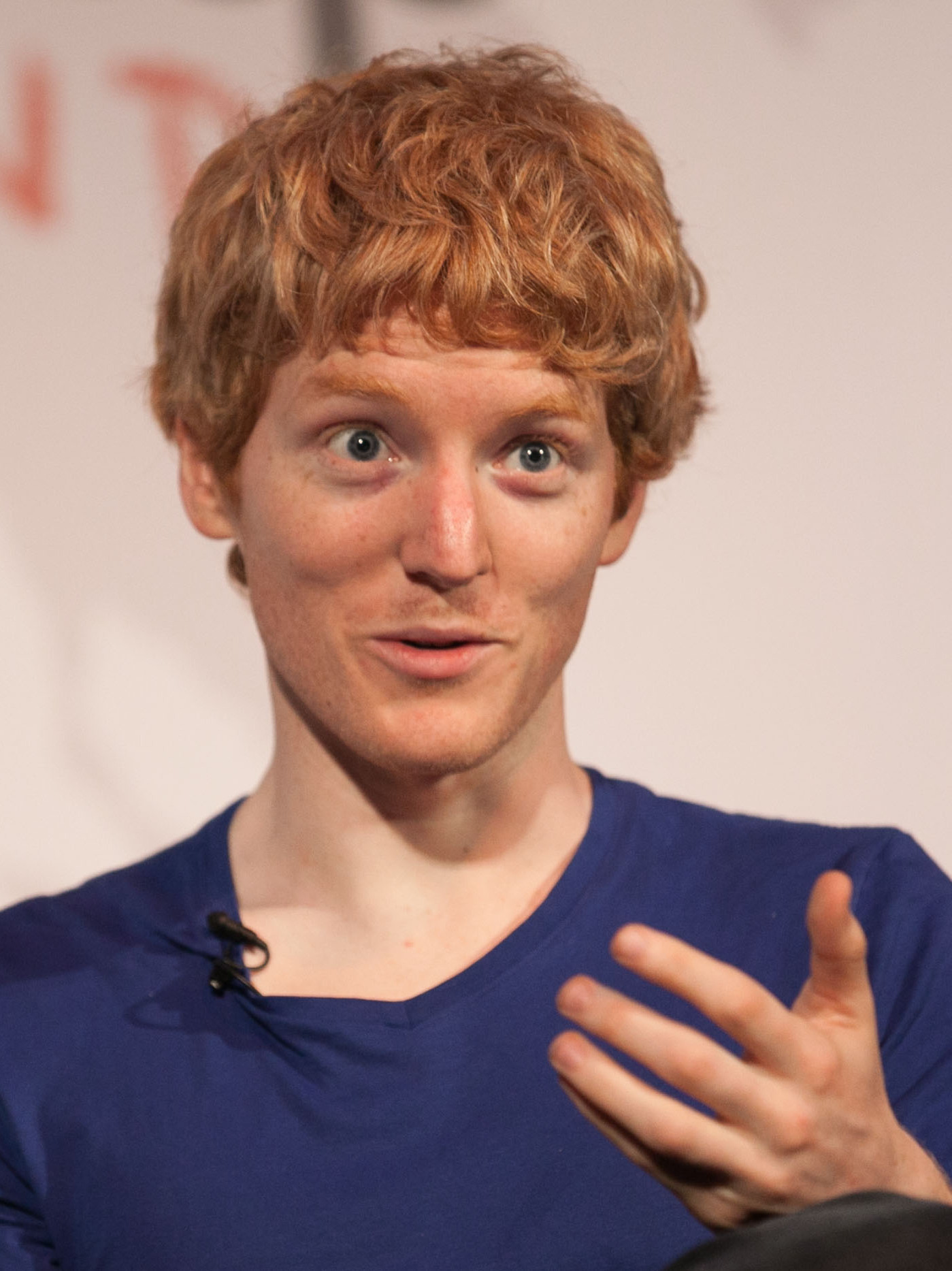
- Collison in 2015
- Born: 9 September 1988 (age 38); Limerick, Ireland
- Education: Gaelscoil Aonach Urmhumhan; Castletroy College; Massachusetts Institute of Technology
- Known for: Stripe, Fast Grants, Arc Institute
- Spouse: Silvana Konermann (m. 2022)
- Relatives: John Collison (brother)
- Awards: BT Young Scientist of the Year (2005)
- Website: patrickcollison.com

Patrick Collison (born 9 September 1988) is an Irish entrepreneur, investor, and philanthropist. He is the chief executive officer of Stripe, which he co-founded with his younger brother, John, in 2010. A billionaire since 2016, his net worth as of August 2026 is estimated at $17.5 billion.

Originally from the west of Ireland, Collison won that country’s 41st Young Scientist and Technology Exhibition in 2005 at the age of sixteen. In 2021, he co-founded Arc Institute, a nonprofit research organization, with bioscientists Silvana Konermann and Patrick Hsu. In 2026, he co-founded the Rhine Group, a policy forum and think tank, with former Italian prime minister Mario Draghi.

== Early life ==
Patrick Collison was born in Limerick on 9 September 1988 to microbiologist Lily and electronic engineer Denis Collison. He and his brothers were brought up in the small village of Dromineer in County Tipperary. The eldest of three boys, he took his first computer course when he was eight years old, at the University of Limerick, and began learning computer programming at the age of ten.

Collison was educated at Gaelscoil Aonach Urmhumhan, Nenagh, before attending Castletroy College in Castletroy, County Limerick.

== Career ==
=== Young Scientist ===
Collison entered the 40th Young Scientist and Technology Exhibition with his project on artificial intelligence (nicknamed 'Isaac' after Isaac Newton, whom Patrick admired), finishing as individual runner-up. He re-entered the following year and, at the age of sixteen, won first place on 14 January 2005. His project involved the creation of Croma, a LISP-type programming language.

His prize of a €7,500 cheque and a trophy of Waterford Crystal was presented to him by President Mary McAleese. His younger brother Tommy participated with his project on blogging in the Young Scientist and Technology Exhibition in 2010.

=== Auctomatic ===
He attended Massachusetts Institute of Technology, but eventually dropped out in 2009 after starting businesses. In 2007, he set up software company 'Shuppa' (a play on the Irish word siopa, meaning 'shop') in Limerick with his brother John Collison. Enterprise Ireland did not allocate funding to the company, prompting a move to California after Silicon Valley's Y Combinator showed interest, where they merged with two Oxford graduates, Harjeet and Kulveer Taggar, and the company became Auctomatic.

On Good Friday of March 2008, Collison, aged nineteen, and his brother, aged seventeen, sold Auctomatic to Canadian company Live Current Media, becoming millionaires. In May 2008, he became director of engineering at the company's new Vancouver base. Collison attributes the success of his company to his win in the Young Scientist and Technology Exhibition.

Both Collison and his younger brother John were featured on a young Irish persons rich list aired on an RTÉ television show during the 2008 Christmas period.

=== Stripe ===
In 2010, Collison co-founded Stripe, which in 2011 received investment of $2 million including from PayPal co-founders Elon Musk and Peter Thiel, and venture capital firms Sequoia Capital, Andreessen Horowitz, and SV Angel.

In November 2016, the Collison brothers became the world's youngest self-made billionaires, worth at least $1.1 billion, after an investment in Stripe from CapitalG and General Catalyst Partners valued the company at $9.2 billion. By 2017, the brothers were notionally worth at least $3.2 billion each.

In 2018, Stripe, under the direction of the Collison brothers, contributed $1 million to California YIMBY, a pro-housing development lobbying organisation.

In September 2019, it was announced that Stripe had raised an additional $250 million at a valuation of $35 billion. Together, the brothers hold a controlling interest in Stripe.

Collison joined the board of Meta Platforms in April 2025.

== Views ==
On 18 July 2009, at the age of 20 and following the publication of the McCarthy Report, Collison outlined his ideas for the future of Ireland on popular talk-show Saturday Night with Miriam.

In November 2026, The Washington Post reported that Sarah B. Rogers, the U.S. under secretary of state for public diplomacy and public affairs, had taken a vacation to the Mediterranean paid for by Collison. U.S. State Department spokespeople described the trip as above board, noting that the trip was planned before Rogers' had been confirmed to her role, that it had properly disclosed the trip to relevant authorities, and that Rogers had not participated in any government matter involving Collison's company.

=== Metascience ===
According to Collison, he reads books and is interested in a broad range of subjects on history, technology, engineering, fiction, philosophy, and art. Metascience has been a theme of Collison's advocacy and philanthropy. In November 2018, Collison published a piece in The Atlantic with Michael Nielsen entitled Science is Getting Less Bang for its Buck, arguing that increased investment in science has not produced commensurate output. In 2019, Collison published an opinion piece in the same outlet with Tyler Cowen arguing for a new academic discipline called "Progress Studies", which would study the cultural and institutional conditions which lead to the most progress and higher standards of living.

In April 2020, Collison and Cowen launched Fast Grants to fund COVID-19-related science. In 2021, Collison co-founded Arc Institute, a nonprofit biomedical research organization focused on research and technology development towards understanding and addressing complex disease, which in 2026 published the first AI-designed viral genome.

== Forbes article ==
A profile of the brothers published in Forbes in 2021 claimed the brothers had "escaped" from Limerick, describing it as a "warzone" because of a gang feud and it was "the 'murder capital' of Europe". It claimed "shootings, pipe bomb attacks, and stabbings" happened there every night. It also claimed that "Some bad neighbourhoods are even walled off by a dirty graffitied 10-foot-high barrier, like the Berlin Wall".

The article received a lot of publicity online, causing a backlash. Collison tweeted "Not only mistaken about Limerick but the idea of 'overcoming' anything is crazy. We are who we are because we grew up where we did". John tweeted it was "daft".

Patrick O'Donovan, a parliamentary representative for Limerick County, called for the magazine and author to apologise to the people of Limerick "for the insult and hurt caused" by it. He also tweeted "I am calling on them to come to Limerick where I will gladly set the record straight in respect of what our county and city has to offer as opposed to what your work of fiction depicts," and "Please let me know when suits to visit." Niall Collins, another representative for Limerick County, tweeted that the article was a "disgraceful description of Limerick, home to so many fine and decent people".

The article was removed from the website on 9 April 2021.

== Personal life ==
In April 2022, Collison married Swiss-American biochemist and Stanford University professor Silvana Konermann, with whom he co-founded the Arc Institute. Collison met Konermann during the 2004 EU Young Scientist competition.

Collison lives in San Francisco, California. He made donations to a group opposing Proposition 40, a proposed one-off wealth tax on California's billionaires, amounting to $7 million by July 2026. By the poll in November 2026, he had donated $33 million and had taken an active role in the campaign against the proposal.

In November 2024, Collison was criticized for visiting Israel and posting an image with the Israeli flag amidst the Gaza war.
