= Ultima Genomics =

American biotechnology company

Ultima Genomics, Inc.
- Type: Private
- Industry: Biotechnology
- Founded: 2016; 10 years ago
- Headquarters: Fremont, California, United States
- Key people: Gilad Almogy (CEO)
- Number of employees: 350
- Website: ultimagenomics.com

Ultima Genomics, Inc. is an American biotechnology company that develops and manufactures systems for high-throughput DNA sequencing. The company is noted for developing a sequencing instrument that it claims can sequence a complete human genome for $80-$100 in reagent costs.

== History ==
Ultima Genomics was founded in 2016 by Israeli-born American engineer Gilad Almogy. In May 2022, the company announced that it had raised $600 million in venture capital from investors including General Atlantic, Andreessen Horowitz, Khosla Ventures, Lightspeed, Playground Global, D1 Capital, and Founders Fund. Together with the funding announcement, Ultima released sequencing data collected using the company's technology in pilot partnerships with researchers at the Broad Institute, Whitehead Institute, Baylor College of Medicine, Stanford University School of Medicine, and New York Genome Center.

== UG 100 platform ==
In 2024, Ultima launched the UG 100 sequencing platform, claiming it to be capable of sequencing 20,000 human genomes per year with variant calling accuracy matching or exceeding that of competitor Illumina's sequencing instruments. The UG 100 has a U.S. list price of $1.5 million and is advertised to be capable of sequencing a complete human genome in 20 hours using $80-$100 of consumable reagents.

The UG 100 replaces a traditional flow cell with a flat circular silicon wafer disk. During sequencing, the disk spins to dispense reagents while two fixed-position cameras continuously acquire data. A ≥300-base median-length run takes approximately 20 hours to complete.

The UG 100's chemistry differs from traditional sequencing-by-synthesis methods in that only one nucleotide species is introduced per data capture cycle, or "flow," eliminating the need for base calling. This flow-based readout results in a distribution of read lengths, with a median length of at least 300 bases, or approximately 250 bases after quality-control filtering. With yields of 10-12 billion reads per wafer, this translates to approximately 2.5-3.0 terabases of usable data per run.

== Partnerships ==
In 2025, Ultima announced it was partnering with Arc Institute to support Arc's virtual cell atlas and competition.

== Gilad Almogy ==
Ultima Genomics founder and CEO Gilad Almogy received a BSc in Mathematics and Physics from Hebrew University and a PhD in Applied Physics, with a focus on quantum optics, at the California Institute of Technology. After graduating, Almogy worked in the semiconductor industry, where he learned about scaling complex technologies. From 1997 to 2009, he worked at Applied Materials, where he rose from a division general manager for wafer inspection to senior vice president.

After working at Applied Materials, Almogy founded a solar company called Cogenra with Vinod Khosla and Samir Kaul. Cogenra was acquired by SunPower in August 2015.

Almogy is also a director of SolarEdge Technologies, Inc. He is a named co-inventor on more than 80 patents.
