= Cas13 =

RNA-targeting CRISPR effector

Cas13 is a family of orthologous CRISPR-associated endonucleases that target RNA (unlike Cas9 and Cas12, which target DNA). Cas13 employs a single endonuclease to bind and cleave specific ssRNAs with sequence complementarity to a guide RNA. Cas13 performs two distinct ribonuclease functions: procession of its own CRISPR RNA and catalysis of target RNA cleavage. The system's specificity allows for the correction of mutations at the transcript level.

Cas13 remains bound to the target RNA and then cleaves other ssRNA molecules indiscriminately. This "collateral" trans-cleavage activity is exploited in the development of various diagnostic technologies. It has been used to efficiently repair KRAS-G12D mRNA in pancreatic cancer models while minimizing effects on healthy cells; adapted into tools such as the REPAIR platform, which edits RNA bases to treat genetic disorders, including Usher syndrome, in animal models; and utilized in diagnostic platforms like SHERLOCK to detect pathogens, tumor DNA, and viral variants with high sensitivity. Other biotechnological applications of Cas13 have included RNA imaging, phage genome engineering, and transient or isoform-specific gene regulation.

== History ==
In 2016, researchers in Feng Zhang's group at MIT and the Broad Institute characterized the nuclease Cas13a (formerly C2c2) from the bacterium Leptotrichia shahii. Its collateral cleavage activity is central to several diagnostic technologies.

In 2018, a team led by Silvana Konermann and Patrick Hsu at the Salk Institute identified Cas13d, a compact subclass of RNA-targeting CRISPR effectors. An engineered variant of Ruminococcus flavefaciens Cas13d, named CasRx, demonstrated high efficiency and specificity in human cells compared to RNA interference. CasRx can be packaged into adeno-associated virus (AAV) vectors for transcriptome engineering and gene therapy.

In 2021, researchers characterized miniature Cas13 protein variants, Cas13X and Cas13Y. Studies using the SARS-CoV-2 N gene sequence as a target showed that these Cas13 variants, when coupled with RT-LAMP, detected SARS-CoV-2 in synthetic and clinical samples with high sensitivity and specificity, comparable to RT-qPCR.

== Applications ==
Cas13 has been adapted to function as an RNA editor capable of correcting mutations without modifying DNA. The REPAIR system utilizes a catalytically inactive, or "dead", Cas13 (dCas13) that binds target RNA without cleaving it. This dCas13 is fused to the catalytic domain of ADAR2, an enzyme that converts adenosine (A) to inosine (I), which is interpreted by the cellular machinery as guanosine (G). This complex can be guided to specific mRNA locations to correct disease-causing mutations.

When combined with a high-fidelity ADAR2 variant, the REPAIR system has demonstrated the ability to edit targets with minimal off-target effects. In murine models of Usher syndrome, the dCas13–ADAR system, delivered via viral vectors, restored usherin protein levels, corrected defective transcripts, and improved vision. These results indicate that Cas13-mediated RNA editing may offer a viable approach for treating genetic disorders.

== See also ==
- Mammoth Biosciences
- Sherlock Biosciences
