= Bridge RNA =

Non-coding RNA involved in IS110-mediated DNA recombination

Bridge RNA is a structured non-coding RNA associated with members of the IS110 family of bacterial and archaeal insertion sequences. Bridge RNAs bind their cognate IS110 recombinase and direct site-specific recombination by base-pairing with both a target DNA sequence and a donor DNA sequence. The RNA therefore acts as a bispecific guide that brings the two DNA substrates together during recombination.

Bridge RNAs were first reported and named by Patrick Hsu’s group at the Arc Institute in a 2024 publication that characterized the Escherichia coli insertion sequence IS621. The system can mediate DNA insertion, excision and inversion.

== Discovery ==
IS110 insertion sequences are mobile genetic elements that encode a DEDD-family recombinase related to RuvC Holliday-junction resolvases. Unlike many other insertion sequence families, IS110 elements generally lack terminal inverted repeats and can integrate into specific genomic target sequences.

Studies of IS621 showed that excision of the element generates a circular DNA intermediate in which the right and left non-coding ends of the element become joined. This junction reconstructs a promoter that drives transcription of a structured non-coding RNA. In IS621, the RNA is approximately 177 nucleotides long and binds the IS621 recombinase with high affinity.

The RNA was named "bridge RNA" because it recognizes both the genomic target DNA and the donor DNA corresponding to the mobile genetic element itself.

== Structure and DNA recognition ==
Comparative sequence and secondary-structure analysis of IS621-related sequences identified a structured RNA containing a 5-prime stem-loop and two prominent internal loops.

One internal loop functions as a target-binding loop, whereas the second acts as a donor-binding loop. Each loop contains sequence segments that base-pair with both strands of its corresponding DNA substrate.

In IS621, the target-binding loop contains a left target guide (LTG) and a right target guide (RTG). The LTG pairs with the left target sequence, whereas the RTG pairs with the right target sequence. The donor-binding loop has an analogous organization, containing a left donor guide (LDG) and a right donor guide (RDG).

These RNA-DNA interactions enable the bridge RNA-recombinase complex to recognize both DNA substrates in a sequence-specific manner.

== Function ==
The bridge RNA is required for recombination by the IS621 recombinase. In vitro reconstitution experiments showed that bridge RNA, IS621 recombinase, target DNA and donor DNA are sufficient to generate the expected recombination products.

Because target and donor recognition are encoded by separate regions of the RNA, the two recognition specificities can be altered independently. Reprogrammed bridge RNAs were shown to redirect recombination to alternative target and donor sequences in E. coli.

Depending on the relative position and orientation of the donor and target sites, the system can mediate DNA insertion, excision or inversion.

== Distribution and evolution ==
Bridge RNAs appear to be widespread among IS110-family insertion sequences. Computational searches using RNA covariance models identified predicted bridge RNAs in most analysed members of both the IS110 and IS1111 groups.

In members of the IS110 group, including IS621, the bridge RNA is generally encoded within the left non-coding end of the element. In IS1111-group elements, the RNA is more commonly encoded within the right non-coding end.

Predicted bridge RNAs vary considerably in sequence, length and secondary structure. Some IS1111-associated RNAs contain more complex donor-recognition regions than the internal loop found in IS621, suggesting structural diversity within the bridge RNA class.

== Biological significance ==
Bridge RNA represents an RNA-guided mechanism for DNA recombination in which a single RNA molecule specifies both interacting DNA substrates. This differs from guide RNAs used by systems such as CRISPR-Cas and Argonaute, which primarily specify a single nucleic-acid target.

The modular recognition of donor and target DNA provides a natural mechanism for programmable DNA rearrangements and has been investigated as a potential basis for genome-engineering technologies.
