= Addgene =

Non-profit plasmid repository organization

- Founded: 2004
- Founder: Benjie Chen; Kenneth Fan; Melina Fan
- Type: Non-profit organization, biological resource center
- Location: Watertown, Massachusetts, USA
- Services: Plasmid repository
- Key people: Chonnettia Jones, Executive director

Addgene is a non-profit plasmid repository. Addgene facilitates the exchange of genetic material between laboratories by offering plasmids and their associated cloning data to non-profit and academic laboratories around the world. Addgene provides a free online database of plasmid cloning information and references, including lists of commonly used vector backbones, popular lentiviral plasmids, and molecular cloning protocols.

== History ==
Addgene was founded in 2004 by Melina Fan, Kenneth Fan, and Benjie Chen. The repository was founded in recognition of the need for a service to support access to and sharing of DNA-based research materials among the scientific community.

== Operations ==
Addgene's headquarters are located in Watertown, Massachusetts.

Addgene accepts plasmids from researchers, then archives and distributes them on request.

The organization covers the operating costs of maintaining and improving the collection by charging a nominal fee to scientists requesting plasmids.

== Plasmid repository ==
As of 2014 Addgene's repository comprised 30,000 plasmids, deposited by 1,700 labs. As of 2024, the collection had grown to a size of over 147,000 plasmids, and had provided services to over 2 million vectors to over 110 different countries. Its plasmid collection contains plasmids used for functions such as genome engineering (including CRISPRS), gene expression, shRNA knockdown, viral-mediated gene delivery, detection of miRNA and promoter activity. The plasmid collection includes:

- Genome engineering
  - CRISPRs
  - Transcription Activator-Like Effector Nuclease (TALEN) kits
  - Zinc finger nuclease kits
- Empty backbones
  - Species-specific expression
  - Epitope tags
  - Fusion proteins
  - Selectable markers
  - Fluorescent marker
- Viral vectors
  - Retroviral/Lentiviral
  - Adenoviral
  - AAV
- cDNA expression
- shRNA expression

== Tools and guides ==
Molecular biology tools

Vector Database—A curated list of over 4,000 vector backbones, including relevant cloning information and bacterial growth conditions.

Sequence Analyzer—An Addgene software tool for creating plasmid maps from sequences with annotated features and restriction sites.

Molecular Biology Reference—A collection of references for molecular biology reagents, such as primers, restriction enzymes and antibiotic concentrations.

Plasmid Cloning Guides

Molecular Cloning Guides—References to help scientists design plasmid cloning experiments, including tutorials on restriction enzyme digestion and PCR-based cloning.

Molecular Cloning Protocols—Specific protocols for a variety of plasmid cloning techniques, such as isolation of bacterial colonies, DNA purification by gel electrophoresis and bacterial transformation.

== Collaborations ==
Addgene collaborates with institutes and consortia to curate plasmid collections for specific purposes. Examples of these collaborations include special collections from the Structural Genomics Consortium, Zinc Finger Consortium, the Cell Migration Consortium, the KLF collection and The Michael J. Fox Foundation. The plasmids are available to both academic and industry labs.

In 2020, Addgene received funding from Fast Grants to subsidize the cost of reagents for COVID-19 research.

== Depositors ==
Noteworthy depositors include:

- 13 Nobel Prize winners; John Gurdon, Shinya Yamanaka, Bruce Beutler, Mario Capecchi, Andrew Fire, Richard Axel, Eric Wieschaus, Phillip Sharp, Robert Lefkowitz, Martin Chalfie, Roger Tsien, Jennifer Doudna, and Johann Deisenhofer.
- 8 Breakthrough Prize in Life Sciences winners; Cori Bargmann, David Botstein, Lewis C. Cantley, Hans Clevers, Titia de Lange, Bert Vogelstein, Robert Weinberg and Shinya Yamanaka.

== Electronic Material Transfer Agreements ==
Addgene requires Material Transfer Agreements (MTAs) for all materials transferred through Addgene to protect the intellectual property of plasmid depositors. Addgene developed one of the first electronic systems for handling MTAs. By using the standard Universal Biological Material Transfer Agreement (UBMTA) and implementing electronic signatures, Addgene's electronic MTA (eMTA) system expedites the approval process for plasmid orders.

== Awards ==
Addgene won awards for innovation and research including Mass Nonprofit Network Award for excellence in Innovations, Cambridge award program 2014 Award for Research & Development Laboratories, Mass Technology Leadership Award Finalist 2012.
