= Chonnettia Jones =

American geneticist and developmental biologist

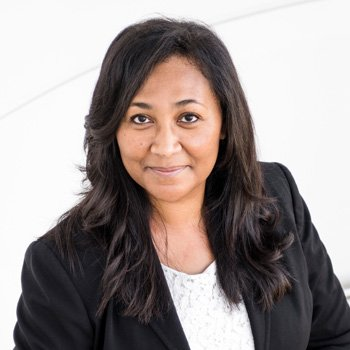
- Education: Emory University (PhD)
- Awards: National Research Service Award
- Scientific career
- Workplaces: Howard Hughes Medical Institute; Wellcome Trust; Michael Smith Foundation for Health Research
- Thesis: Molecular and functional characterization of mini-me, a dominant modifier of hedgehog in Drosophila eye development (2005)
- Doctoral advisor: Kevin Moses

Chonnettia Jones is an American geneticist and developmental biologist. She has served as the executive director of Addgene since 2022. Jones was previously the vice president of research at the Michael Smith Foundation for Health Research and the director of Insight & Analysis at the Wellcome Trust.

== Education and career ==
Jones is a geneticist and developmental biologist. She was a Ruth L. Kirschstein research fellow at Emory University where she researched developmental neurobiology while completing a Ph.D. in biochemistry, cell and developmental biology. Jones' dissertation 2005 was titled Molecular and functional characterization of mini-me, a dominant modifier of hedgehog in Drosophila eye development. Her doctoral advisor was Kevin Moses.

Jones was a professor at American universities before managing the Howard Hughes Medical Institute scientific research program at the Janelia Research Campus. She joined Wellcome Trust in 2012 to evaluate the impact of their funded grants. In January 2016, Jones became the director of insight and analysis at Wellcome. In January 2020, Jones was announced as the vice president of research at the Michael Smith Foundation for Health Research in British Columbia effective on April 14, 2020. On May 9, 2022, she became the executive director of Addgene.

== Selected works ==
- Jones, Chonnettia; Chen, Ping (February 2007). "Planar cell polarity signaling in vertebrates". BioEssays. 29 (2): 120–132. doi:10.1002/bies.20526. PMC 4158832. PMID 17226800.
- Qian, Dong; Jones, Chonnettia; Rzadzinska, Agnieszka; Mark, Sharayne; Zhang, Xiaohui; Steel, Karen P.; Dai, Xing; Chen, Ping (June 2007). "Wnt5a functions in planar cell polarity regulation in mice". Developmental Biology. 306 (1): 121–133. doi:10.1016/j.ydbio.2007.03.011. PMC 1978180. PMID 17433286.
- Chen, Ping; Yoder, Bradley K.; Petit, Christine; Boglarka Banizs; Qian, Dong; Foucher, Isabelle; Roper, Venus C.; Jones, Chonnettia (January 2008). "Ciliary proteins link basal body polarization to planar cell polarity regulation". Nature Genetics. 40 (1): 69–77. doi:10.1038/ng.2007.54. ISSN 1546-1718. PMID 18066062. S2CID 20919691.
