= Alexa Johnston =

New Zealand author, art curator and historian

- Education: Northcote College, University of Auckland
- Writing career
- Genres: Biography, cookery
- Notable works: Sir Edmund Hillary: An Extraordinary Life, Ladies, a Plate
- Notable awards: Lifestyle & Contemporary Culture Award, Recipe Book of the Year
- Website: Ladies, a plate

Alexa Johnston is an author, art curator, and historian from New Zealand.

== Background ==
Johnston attended Northcote College. She studied Art History at the University of Auckland.

== Career ==
Johnston worked for nineteen years as a curator at the Auckland Art Gallery Toi o Tāmaki.

Following the 2002 exhibition, 'Sir Edmund Hillary: Everest and Beyond', which she curated for Auckland Museum, Johnston published her first book, Sir Edmund Hillary: An Extraordinary Life. The book was translated into German by Ursula Pesch and Hans Freundl. Johnston collaborated with David Larsen to write Reaching the Summit, biography of Edmund Hillary for young adults.

Johnston has published a number of books celebrating New Zealand's culinary history including Ladies, a Plate (2008), A Second Helping (2009), What's For Pudding? (2011), and Ladies, a Plate: Jams and Preserves (2016).

In 2016, Johnston edited and revised the Edmonds Cookery Book for its 69th De Luxe edition.

== Awards ==
Sir Edmund Hillary: An Extraordinary Life received the non-fiction honour award in the 2008 New Zealand Book Awards for Children and Young Adults.

The first book in her cookery series, Ladies, a Plate, won the Lifestyle & Contemporary Culture Award at the 2009 Montana New Zealand Book Awards. It also won the Publishers' Association of New Zealand Award for Best Illustrated Book and was Recipe Book of the Year in the New Zealand Guild of Food Writers Culinary Quill Awards.

Johnston's books have also won design awards, including Best Cover in the 2006 Spectrum Book Design Awards for Sir Edmund Hillary: An Extraordinary Life and Nielsen Award for Best Book for Ladies, A Plate at the 2009 PANZ Book Design Awards.
