= Daughter of Time Trilogy =

Omnibus of novels by Erec Stebbins

- Paperback and hardcovers, first ed.
- Author: Erec Stebbins
- Language: English
- Genre: Science fiction, Metafiction, Philosophical fiction, Speculative fiction, Parallel universe (fiction), Alternate history, Space opera, Science fantasy, Alien invasion
- Publisher: Twice Pi Press
- Publication date: 2015
- Publication place: United States
- Media type: Print (hardback & paperback), ebook(Amazon Kindle), Audiobook
- Pages: 910 pp (First edition)
- ISBN: 9781942360063

The Daughter of Time Trilogy is the omnibus of the novels Reader, Writer, and Maker by biomedical scientist Erec Stebbins. The novels are space operas and metaphysical adventure fiction centered on the character Ambra Dawn, a slave with the ability to "read” and "write” spacetime. The trilogy features elements of cosmology, parallel universe (fiction), time travel, alternate history, prescience, telepathy, telekinesis, alien invasion, cybernetics, and spirituality, with the novels repeatedly breaking the fourth wall as characters speak directly to and request specific actions from the reader. Each novel is narrated in the first person by a different character.

== Reviews ==
Publishers Weekly called the first novel "thoughtful science fiction” and ”a new and imaginative series.” Kirkus Reviews noted that Reader was "a richly detailed, compelling story about the power of love.” Foreword Reviews wrote of the series that "these are works that nurture wonder and sometimes break hearts.” Midwest Book Review comments that for Reader “mature teen and young adult readers alike will find Ambra's story involving and engrossing,” and that Writer is “another epic story.”

Critical comments note that “it retreads some of the same paths repeatedly,” "by plot alone, Reader sounds fairly ordinary,” “the narrative bogs down at times due to overly long inner monologue,” and that the ending is “incomprehensible.”

== Characters ==
Reader (Daughter of Time, Book 1)

- Ambra Dawn - Narrator, Earth woman, the "Daughter of Time” and central protagonist
- Thel of Xix - Alien and Ambra Dawn’s first mentor
- Waythrel of Xix - Ambra Dawn’s Advocate on Dram and second mentor
- Richard Cross - Leader of the resistance to the Dram hegemony

Writer (Daughter of Time, Book 2)

- Nitin Ratava - Narrator, lover/consort of Ambra Dawn, Earth Force soldier
- Ambra Dawn - The "Daughter of Time” and central series protagonist
- Waythrel of Xix - Alien and close advisor and confidant of Ambra Dawn
- Sepehr Mazandarani - Counselor of Ambra Dawn
- Tomoko Mizoguchi - Former Major of Earth Force and Leader of the Temple Guardians
- Aisha Williams - Warrant Officer to Captain Ratava
- David Kim - Master Sergeant to Captain Ratava
- Ryan Marshall - Sergeant First Class, medical officer to Captain Ratava
- Erica Fox - Sergeant and engineer to Captain Ratava
- Grant Moore - Weapons Sergeant to Captain Ratava
- Synphel of Xix - Alien and reproductive-group mate of Waythrel

Maker (Daughter of Time, Book 3)

- Waythrel of Xix - Narrator, alien and close advisor and confidant of Ambra Dawn
- Ambra Dawn - The "Daughter of Time” and central series protagonist
- Kloan - Clone of Ambra Dawn, kidnapper of Waythrel of Xix
- Nitin Ratava - Lover/consort of Ambra Dawn, Earth Force soldier
- Synphel of Xix - Alien and reproductive-group mate of Waythrel

== See also ==
- Erec Stebbins
- The Ragnarök Conspiracy
- Intel 1 Series
