= Color Health =

US population health technology company

Color Health, Inc.
- Trade name: Color
- Type: Private
- Industry: Healthcare, Cancer Care
- Founded: April 2015; 11 years ago as Color Genomics
- Founders: Elad Gil, Nish Bhat, Taylor Sittler, and Othman Laraki
- Headquarters: Burlingame, California, US
- Area served: 100+ Countries
- Key people: Othman Laraki (CEO)
- Products: Cancer risk, detection, and care.
- Website: color.com

Color Health, Inc. (founded as Color Genomics) is an American healthcare company focused on cancer care delivery. The company operates a Virtual Cancer Clinic that provides services in cancer prevention, detection, screening, diagnosis, and survivorship care.

== History ==
Color was co-founded in 2015 by Elad Gil, Nish Bhat, Taylor Sittler, and Othman Laraki, who serves as the company's CEO, in Burlingame, California.

In November 2021, the company raised $100 million in a Series E financing round led by General Catalyst.

In 2023, Color refocused its efforts from population genomics and COVID-19 testing to cancer care delivery, introducing its Virtual Cancer Clinic, a wholly-owned, vertically integrated cancer care platform that offers early detection, oncology based care, and survivorship support as an employer-offered health care benefit.

== Cancer Care Model ==
In 2023, Color Health launched its Virtual Cancer Clinic to provide cancer risk assessment, early detection, treatment coordination, and survivorship support. Care is delivered in accordance with established clinical guidelines by oncology-trained clinicians, primary care physicians, and genetic counselors licensed in all 50 U.S. states.

According to the company, first-year participation typically ranges from 20 to 30 percent of eligible individuals, with reported increases in screening adherence of up to 77 percent and shorter timelines from screening to diagnosis by up to 55 percent.

External reporting has noted that Color piloted the use of artificial intelligence tools to generate cancer screening and diagnostic plans, with the goal of reducing missed workups and creating standardized recommendations.

The Virtual Cancer Clinic also includes behavioral health support programs, a national imaging network, and care advocacy services.

In 2025, Color presented findings at the American Society of Clinical Oncology (ASCO) annual meeting from telehealth-based cancer screening programs for colorectal and lung cancers. These initiatives used at-home testing and virtual assessments to increase access to early detection services.

=== Partnership ===
- American Cancer Society (ACS): Color and ACS have partnered to promote cancer screening through employers and unions, combining ACS guidelines and patient resources with Color's Virtual Cancer Clinic to expand access to evidence-based cancer care.
- MSK Direct – Memorial Sloan Kettering Cancer Center: In collaboration with MSK Direct, Color connects employees nationwide to MSK's oncology expertise through its Virtual Cancer Clinic.
- Carrum Health: Color and Carrum Health have partnered to integrate early detection, navigation, and post-diagnosis care with Carrum's Centers of Excellence model for cancer and surgical care.
- Collective Health: Through a partnership with Collective Health, members can access Color's Virtual Cancer Clinic via the My Collective™ portal, enabling integrated care, eligibility tracking, and reporting.
- University of California San Francisco (UCSF) and OpenAI: Color collaborated with UCSF and OpenAI to develop an AI-powered “Cancer Copilot” tool, designed to assist clinicians in delivering guideline-based care. The tool demonstrated over 95 percent concordance on patient cases in early testing.

== COVID-19 Testing Programs ==
In 2020, Color redirected its existing laboratory and logistics operations to focus on COVID-19 testing. The company operated a CLIA-certified laboratory and some of the highest-capacity testing sites in the United States at the time.

Color provided testing for the City of San Francisco's CityTestSF program, Alameda County Health Services, and several universities and employers, including the University of Southern California and United Airlines.

By 2022, the company had processed millions of tests nationwide, though demand for testing declined and operations were scaled back.

== Genetics ==
Color's initial products focused on affordable genetic testing for hereditary cancer. Its CLIA-certified and CAP-accredited laboratory continues to provide genomic testing and genetic counseling.

The company's tests analyze genes associated with hereditary cancer syndromes, including BRCA1 and BRCA2, as well as 27 other genes associated with breast, prostate, colon, uterine, stomach, melanoma, pancreatic, and ovarian cancers.

== Research ==
Since 2018, Color has been a genome center for the National Institutes of Health's All of Us Research Program, which aims to sequence one million or more individuals in the United States to advance precision medicine research.

In 2019, Color was awarded responsibility for delivering genetic counseling across the All of Us program.

The company has participated in research initiatives, including:

- All of Us Research Program (NIH): Color is one of three Clinical Validation Laboratories for the National Institutes of Health's All of Us initiative and serves as the program's sole provider of genetic counseling. The study aims to return health-related genetic information to over one million participants in the United States to support precision medicine research.
- FLOSSIES Cohort: In partnership with Mary-Claire King and the University of Washington, Color contributed sequencing for the Fabulous Ladies Over Seventy cohort, creating a publicly available dataset of hereditary cancer variants in older women.
- Color Data: A database of aggregated genetic and clinical information from 50,000 individuals who used Color's tests, released publicly to support genotype–phenotype research and drug discovery.
- MAGENTA Study: In collaboration with the Stand Up To Cancer Dream Team, Color provided genetic testing and tele-counseling for individuals at increased risk for hereditary cancer syndromes.
- WISDOM Study: Color is the exclusive genomic testing partner for the WISDOM trial, a 100,000-person study comparing annual mammograms with risk-based screening. The trial is led by the University of California system in partnership with Sanford Health.
- PROMISE Study: Led by Johns Hopkins and Fred Hutchinson Cancer Research Center, the PROMISE registry is exploring the role of inherited mutations in prostate cancer outcomes and treatment. Color provides clinical genetic testing for study participants.
- GENtleMEN Study: Conducted with Fred Hutchinson Cancer Research Center and the University of Washington, this study offers genetic testing and counseling to men with advanced prostate cancer. It focuses on reducing barriers to access such as cost and geography.
- Cleveland African American Prostate Cancer Project (CAAPP): In partnership with Case Western Reserve University, Color provides hereditary cancer testing and counseling in community settings such as barbershops in Cleveland to increase access among Black men.
- Genetic Information and Family Testing (GIFT) Study: In partnership with the University of Michigan and Stanford University, Color supports family-based genetic testing for cancer patients and their relatives. The study examines factors influencing participation in hereditary cancer prevention programs.

Color also contributes anonymized variants to ClinVar, a database managed by the National Center for Biotechnology Information (NCBI) at the National Institutes of Health (NIH).
