= Erec Stebbins =

American biomedical researcher (born 1969)

Charles Erec Stebbins
- Born: December 5, 1969 (age 56); Lincoln, Nebraska, U.S.
- Education: Oberlin College
- Occupations: research scientist, novelist
- Scientific career
- Fields: Structural biology, microbiology
- Workplaces: The Rockefeller University, German Cancer Research Center
- Doctoral advisor: Nikola Pavletich
- Website: www.erecstebbins.com

Erec Stebbins (born 1969) is an American biomedical scientist and novelist. Head of Rockefeller University's Laboratory of Structural Microbiology from 2001 to 2016 and currently Head of Division of Structural Biology of Infection and Immunity at the German Cancer Research Center, he is known for his contributions to the fields of cancer research and infectious disease, studying the structure of disease-related proteins through the technique of X-ray crystallography. He is a published academic writer and has been cited by his peers for his work in cancer research and infectious disease. He is also a novelist and author of science fiction (Daughter of Time Trilogy) and thrillers (The Ragnarök Conspiracy, Extraordinary Retribution).

== Biography ==
Stebbins was born Charles Erec Stebbins on December 5, 1969. He received his B.A. from Oberlin College in 1992 and his Ph.D. from the Weill Cornell Graduate School of Medical Sciences in 1999. His Ph.D. thesis was titled Structural Studies of the von Hippel-Lindau Tumor Suppressor and the Oncogene Chaperone Hsp90, completed in the laboratory of Nikola Pavletich. He conducted postdoctoral studies in microbiology in the laboratory of Jorge Galán at Yale University from 1999 to 2001. In 2001, he was hired as an assistant professor and made the Head of Laboratory of Structural Microbiology at the Rockefeller University. In 2006, he was promoted to associate professor. He is currently Head of the Division of Structural Biology of Infection and Immunity at the German Cancer Research Center. His work has been profiled in the lay press at The New York Times.

In 2012, with the Prometheus Books imprint Seventh Street Books, Stebbins published The Ragnarök Conspiracy, a contemporary thriller centered on a plot by terrorists to instigate a global war between Western and Islamic nations. Stebbins has said that his debut novel was inspired by his witnessing the September 11 attacks while he lived in New York City.

== Select publications ==
- Stebbins CE, Borukhov S, Orlova M, Polyakov A, Goldfarb A, Darst SA (1995). "Crystal structure of the GreA transcript cleavage factor from Escherichia coli". Nature. 373 (6515): 636–640. Bibcode:1995Natur.373..636S. doi:10.1038/373636a0. PMID 7854424. S2CID 4327539.
- Stebbins CE, Russo AA, Schneider C, Rosen N, Hartl FU, Pavletich NP (April 1997). "Crystal structure of an Hsp90-geldanamycin complex: targeting of a protein chaperone by an antitumor agent". Cell. 89 (2): 239–250. doi:10.1016/S0092-8674(00)80203-2. PMID 9108479. S2CID 5253110.
- Stebbins CE, Kaelin WG Jr, Pavletich NP (1999). "Structure of the VHL-ElonginC-ElonginB complex: implications for von Hippel-Lindau tumor suppressor function". Science. 284 (5413): 455–461. doi:10.1126/science.284.5413.455. PMID 10205047.
- Stebbins CE, Galán JE (2001). "Structural Mimicry in Bacterial Virulence". Nature. 412 (6848): 701–705. Bibcode:2001Natur.412..701S. doi:10.1038/35089000. PMID 11507631. S2CID 4418873.
- Stebbins CE, Galán JE (2001). "Maintenance of an unfolded polypeptide by a cognate chaperone in bacterial type III secretion". Nature. 414 (6859): 77–81. Bibcode:2001Natur.414...77S. doi:10.1038/35102073. PMID 11689946. S2CID 20213272.
- Lilic M, Galkin VE, Orlova A, VanLoock MS, Egelman EH, Stebbins CE (2003). "Salmonella SipA Polymerizes Actin by Stapling Filaments with non-Globular Protein Arms". Science. 301 (5641): 1918–1921. Bibcode:2003Sci...301.1918L. doi:10.1126/science.1088433. PMID 14512630. S2CID 24011057.
- Nesić D, Hsu Y, Stebbins CE (2004). "Assembly and function of a bacterial genotoxin". Nature. 429 (6990): 429–433. Bibcode:2004Natur.429..429N. doi:10.1038/nature02532. PMID 15164065. S2CID 4373500.
- Janjusevic R, Abramovitch RB, Martin GB, Stebbins CE (2006). "A Bacterial Inhibitor of Host Programmed Cell Death Defenses is an E3 Ubiquitin Ligase". Science. 311 (5758): 222–226. Bibcode:2006Sci...311..222J. doi:10.1126/science.1120131. PMID 16373536. S2CID 31167235.
- Prehna G, Ivanov MI, Bliska JB, Stebbins CE (2006). "Yersinia virulence depends on mimicry of host rho-family nucleotide dissociation inhibitors". Cell. 126 (5): 869–880. doi:10.1016/j.cell.2006.06.056. PMID 16959567. S2CID 2670805.
- Quezada CM, Hicks SW, Galán JE, Stebbins CE (2009). "A family of Salmonella virulence factors functions as a distinct class of autoregulated E3 ubiquitin ligases". Proc Natl Acad Sci U S A. 106 (12): 4864–4869. Bibcode:2009PNAS..106.4864Q. doi:10.1073/pnas.0811058106. PMC 2653562. PMID 19273841.
- Nesić D, Miller MC, Quinkert ZT, Stein M, Chait BT, Stebbins CE (2010). "Helicobacter pylori CagA Inhibits PAR1/MARK Family Kinases by Mimicking Host Substrates". Nat Struct Mol Biol. 17 (1): 130–132. doi:10.1038/nsmb.1705. PMC 3006182. PMID 19966800.
- Nesić D, Buti L, Lu X, Stebbins CE (2014). "Structure of the Helicobacter pylori CagA Oncogene Bound to the Human Tumor Suppressor Apoptosis-stimulating Protein of p53-2 (ASPP2)". Proc Natl Acad Sci U S A. 111 (4): 1562–1567. doi:10.1073/pnas.1320631111. PMC 3910616. PMID 24474782.

== Awards ==
- 2008 EUREKA
- 2004 ICAAC Young Investigator Award
- 2003 NYSTAR James Watson Investigator
- 2000 Molecular Structure Corporation Future Investigator Award
- 1999 Julian R. Rachele Prize, Weill Graduate School of Medical Sciences of Cornell University

== Personal life ==
Stebbins is married and has three children. He resides in Heidelberg.
