= Susan Daniel (chemical engineer) =

American chemical engineer

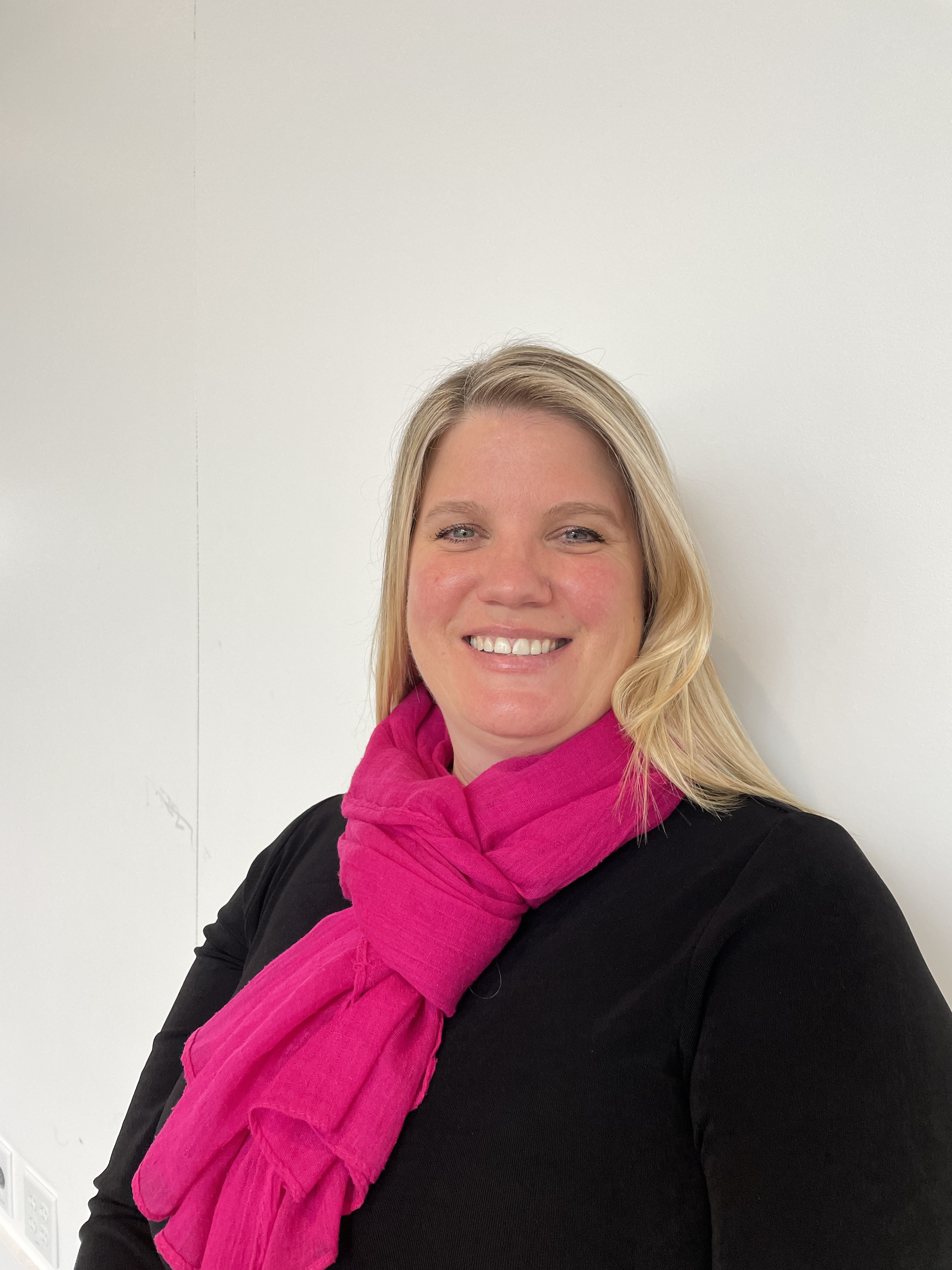
- Susan Daniel at the Spring 2024 meeting of the Materials Research Society in Seattle
- Born: Philadelphia
- Education: Lehigh University
- Scientific career
- Workplaces: Cornell University; Texas A&M University
- Thesis: The effect of vibration on liquid drop motion (2005)
- Website: Daniel Team

Susan Daniel is an American chemical engineer who is a Professor of Chemical and Biomolecular Engineering at Cornell University. Her research considers membrane biophysics and bioelectronic devices. During the COVID-19 pandemic Daniel used bioelectronic devices to develop COVID-19 disease drugs.

== Early life and education ==
Daniel was born in suburban Philadelphia. Her father was an immigrant from Germany, who relocated to Pennsylvania on leaving Europe. Daniel was the first member of her family to attend college. During high school she became inspired by chemistry. She was an undergraduate student in chemical engineering at Lehigh University. She wondered whether she might be interested in research, and visited the office of Manoj Chaudhury. He asked her to study the movement of liquid droplets on various surfaces with different surface tension. Remarkably, her first journey into research ended up published in Science, before she had even earned her master's degree. She remained at Lehigh University for her doctoral research, continuing to study the motion of liquid droplets on surfaces with different wettabilities. As part of her droplet research, she developed technologies to manipulate fluids in miniature devices. The devices she developed allowed the precise mixing of droplets as well as thermosensitive reactions. Her research attracted considerable attention, and she started working with Pierre-Gilles de Gennes on how to create ratchet motion with the droplets.

== Research and career ==
After completing her doctorate Daniel joined the laboratory of Paul Cremer at Texas A&M University. Here she shifted focus, concentrating on biological interfaces and the development of cell membranes. Specifically, Daniel worked on solid-supported lipid bilayers. She showed that an artificial glycocalyx-like nanostructure could serve as a size-selective filter for protein binding. This achievement inspired Daniel to use the solid-supported lipid bilayers to separate membrane-bound species via electrophoresis.

In 2007 Daniel joined Cornell University in the Smith School of Chemical and Biomolecular Engineering, where she leads two distinct research programmes, one focused on biological function and the other on surface science. She is interested in the role of membrane lipids in biological interactions, with a focus on how viruses interact with cell membranes. Her motivation to study virus – membrane interactions lies in the potential to hijack the virus and use it to perform specific tasks.

She has identified the speed at which viral genomes are transferred out of viruses and into the cell membranes. Cell membranes contain a variety of proteins and biomolecules, which are held within a matrix of lipid phases. Daniel believes that the interactions of these lipid phases control the regulation of the function of the cell membrane. Alongside her biology-focussed work, Daniel investigates the motion and coalescence of droplets.

Daniel pioneered the development of biomembrane platforms that permit the recreation of cellular processes on a chip. During the COVID-19 pandemic, Daniel worked with Róisín Owens, a biochemist she met whilst a visiting scholar at the École nationale supérieure des mines de Saint-Étienne, on devices that allowed the rapid testing of potential COVID-19 drugs. Daniel used membrane fusion to identify a specific targets for anti-viral drugs. To continue her studies of coronaviruses, she was awarded seed-funding from the Office of the Vice Provost for Research (OVPR).

== Academic service ==
Daniel is involved with various initiatives to promote women in science. On arriving at Cornell University she became interested in the women's engineering group, and is a member of Women in Science and Engineering (WISE) at Cornell. She was appointed Director of Graduate Studies at Cornell University in 2016, and under her leadership she recruited the most diverse class in the history of the school of Chemical and Biomolecular Engineering.

== Awards and honours ==
- 2012 Anita Borg Institute Denice Denton Emerging Leader Award
- 2012 National Science Foundation CAREER Award
- 2016 Schwartz Life Sciences award
- 2017 College of Engineering's Research Excellence Award
- 2020 Elected Chair of the Gordon Research Conference on Bioanalytical Sensors
- 2020 Cornell University College of Engineering Senior Faculty Champion Award

== Selected publications ==
- Daniel, S. (2001-01-26). "Fast Drop Movements Resulting from the Phase Change on a Gradient Surface". Science. 291 (5504): 633–636. Bibcode:2001Sci...291..633D. doi:10.1126/science.291.5504.633. ISSN 0036-8075. PMID 11158672.
- Daniel, Susan; Chaudhury, Manoj K. (2002-04-01). "Rectified Motion of Liquid Drops on Gradient Surfaces Induced by Vibration". Langmuir. 18 (9): 3404–3407. doi:10.1021/la025505c. ISSN 0743-7463.
- Daniel, Susan; Chaudhury, Manoj K.; de Gennes, P.-G. (2005-04-01). "Vibration-Actuated Drop Motion on Surfaces for Batch Microfluidic Processes". Langmuir. 21 (9): 4240–4248. doi:10.1021/la046886s. ISSN 0743-7463. PMID 15836001.
