= Debby Bogaert =

Dutch physician

- Born: 15 July 1974; Goes
- Alma mater: Erasmus University Rotterdam
- Academic career
- Institutions: University of Edinburgh (2016–); University Medical Center Utrecht (2008–); Royal Hospital for Sick Children (2016–); Harvard T.H. Chan School of Public Health (2006–2008); Erasmus MC (1998–2007)

Debby Bogaert (Goes, Netherlands, 1974-07-15) is a Dutch physician who is Professor of Paediatric Infectious Diseases at the University of Edinburgh. Her research considers the physiology and pathophysiology of respiratory infections.

== Early life and education ==
Debby Bogaert was born in Goes, in the Dutch province Zeeland. There she attended secondary school at Sint Willibrord College. In 1992 she did her VWO exam and went to Utrecht, to do a medical education at Utrecht University. In 1996 she graduated cum laude for her doctoral exam.

For her PhD she was a student at Erasmus University Rotterdam where she worked on the pathogenesis of pneumococcal infections and the molecular epidemiology of bacterial colonisation. Bogaert trained in medicine at Sophia Children's Hospital, part of Erasmus Medical Center. In 2006, she joined Marc Lipsitch as a postdoctoral fellow, where she conducted in vitro and animal studies on the susceptibility of infants to pneumococcal colonisation.

== Research and career ==
Bogaert was made a physician scientist in the Department of Pediatric Immunology at University Medical Center Utrecht in 2008. She led ecological studies of the upper respiratory tract microbiome and how it related to the pathogenesis of respiratory infections. She was supported by the Dutch Research Council to validate and adapt a metagenomic pipeline. She was one of the first researchers to study the role of the microbiome on the respiratory tract.

During the COVID-19 pandemic, Bogaert herself became a COVID-19 "long-hauler" and interested in the epidemiology of long COVID.

== Awards and honours ==
- 2004 NVK young investigator award (NVK=Nederlandse Vereniging voor Kindergeneeskunde; Pediatric Association of the Netherlands)
- 2006 Dutch Academy of Medical Sciences Ter Meulen Award
- 2009 Dutch NWO Veni laureate

== Selected publications ==
- Bogaert, Debby (2004). Host-pathogen interaction during Streptococcus pneumoniae colonization and infection. Wikidata: Q108731858 (thesis)
- Debby Bogaert; Paul van der Valk; Reshmi Ramdin; Marcel Sluijter; Evelyn Monninkhof; Ron Hendrix; Ronald de Groot; Peter W M Hermans (1 February 2004). "Host-pathogen interaction during pneumococcal infection in patients with chronic obstructive pulmonary disease". Infection and Immunity. 72 (2): 818–823. doi:10.1128/IAI.72.2.818-823.2004. ISSN 0019-9567. PMC 321632. PMID 14742525. Wikidata Q40469947.
- D Bogaert; R De Groot; P W M Hermans (1 March 2004). "Streptococcus pneumoniae colonisation: the key to pneumococcal disease". Lancet Infectious Diseases. 4 (3): 144–154. doi:10.1016/S1473-3099(04)00938-7. ISSN 1473-3099. PMID 14998500. Wikidata Q35681330.
- Giske Biesbroek; Evgeni Tsivtsivadze; Elisabeth A M Sanders; Roy Montijn; Reinier H Veenhoven; Bart J F Keijser; Debby Bogaert (1 December 2014). "Early respiratory microbiota composition determines bacterial succession patterns and respiratory health in children". American Journal of Respiratory and Critical Care Medicine. 190 (11): 1283–1292. doi:10.1164/RCCM.201407-1240OC. ISSN 1073-449X. PMID 25329446. Wikidata Q41695390.
- Wing Ho Man; Wouter A A de Steenhuijsen Piters; Debby Bogaert (20 March 2017). "The microbiota of the respiratory tract: gatekeeper to respiratory health". Nature Reviews Microbiology. 15 (5): 259–270. doi:10.1038/NRMICRO.2017.14. ISSN 1740-1534. PMC 7097736. PMID 28316330. Wikidata Q34553608.
- Bogaert, Debby (2020-06-28). "The coronavirus 'long-haulers' show how little we still know". The Guardian. Archived from the original on 2021-09-21.
