= Daniel Nomura =

American chemical biologist

Daniel K. Nomura
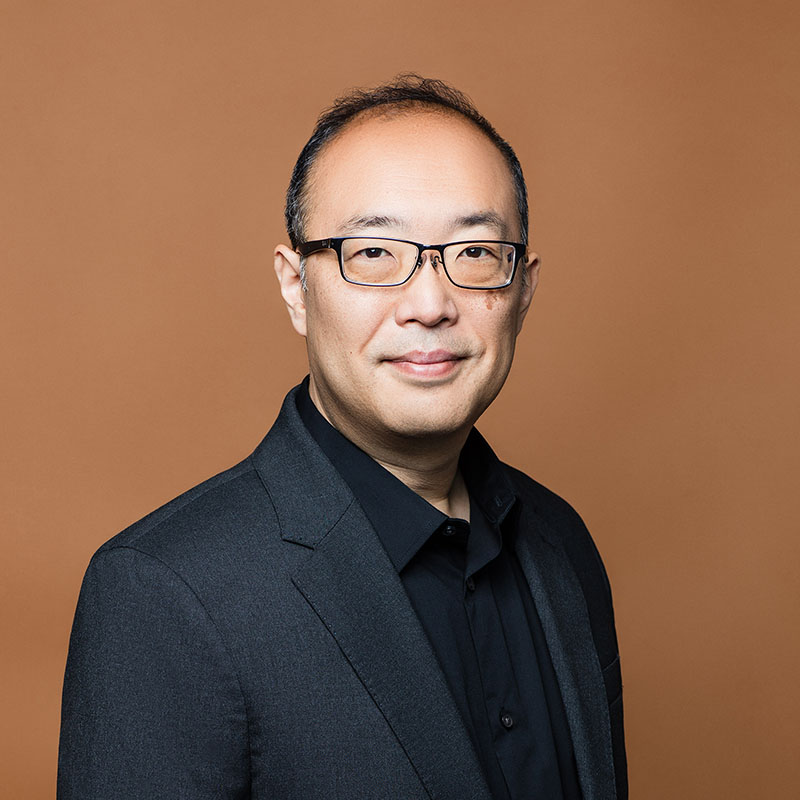
- Born: July 10, 1981 (age 45)
- Education: University of California, Berkeley; University of California, Berkeley
- Scientific career
- Fields: Chemical Biology, Chemistry, Molecular and Cell Biology, Drug Discovery, Cancer Biology
- Workplaces: UC Berkeley; Innovative Genomics Institute; Novartis-Berkeley Translational Chemical Biology Institute

Daniel K. Nomura is an American chemical biologist and Professor of Chemical Biology and Molecular Therapeutics at the University of California, Berkeley, in the Departments of Chemistry and Molecular & Cell Biology. His work employs chemoproteomic approaches to develop small molecule therapeutics and therapeutic modalities against traditionally "undruggable" proteins.

He is a member of the scientific advisory committee of the Mark Foundation for Cancer Research, a foundation set up by billionaire Alexander Knaster which funds early-stage cancer research. He is also an Investment Advisory Partner for a16z, an Investment Advisor for Droia Ventures, and an iPartner with The Column Group. Nomura is also the Co-Director of the Molecular Therapeutics Initiative with Professor Roberto Zoncu at UC Berkeley.

== Research and education ==
Nomura received his BA in Molecular and Cell Biology in 2003 and PhD in Molecular Toxicology in 2008 from UC Berkeley, studying under the mentorship of John Casida. He went on to perform his postdoctoral research with Ben Cravatt at Scripps Research in La Jolla, California. There he discovered a role for monoacylglycerol lipase in generating oncogenic signaling lipids that promote cancer and in proinflammatory cascades that impact neurodegenerative disorders. In 2011, Nomura started his independent research group at UC Berkeley. His work focuses on implementing chemoproteomic platforms to develop small molecule therapeutics against traditionally "undruggable" proteins. These approaches have led to the discovery of novel inhibitors and new ligands that expand the scope of proteolysis targeting chimeras (PROTACS), which are bifunctional molecules that harness the cells ubiquitin-proteasome system to degrade targets of interest. Notable recent discoveries include an inhibitor of mTORC1, a molecular glue between UBR7 and p53 that activates p53 tumor suppressor activity, covalent destabilizing degraders against transcription factors MYC, CTNNB1, AR/AR-V7, and IRF5/8, novel covalent recruiters against E3 ubiquitin ligases such as RNF114, RNF4, and FEM1B for targeted protein degradation applications, the Deubiquitinase Targeting Chimera (DUBTAC) platform for targeted protein stabilization, chemical rational design strategy for developing molecular glue degraders, and a targeted transcriptional repression or Transcriptional Repression via Active Chemical Epigenetic Reprogramming (TRACER) platform for loci-specific epigenetic repression of transcriptional programming. In 2017, Nomura became the Director of the Novartis-Berkeley Translational Chemical Biology Institute, which aims to develop chemical technologies and therapeutics against undruggable targets. Nomura is also co-founder of Frontier Medicines, Vicinitas Therapeutics, and Zenith Therapeutics. In February 2025, Nomura also became the Editor-in-Chief for Molecular Cancer Therapeutics.

== Awards ==
- 2019 Mark Foundation for Cancer Research ASPIRE award
- 2022 National Cancer Institute Outstanding Investigator Award
