= Judith Frydman =

Biochemist

Judith Frydman is a biochemist and the Donald Kennedy Chair in the School of Humanities & Sciences and Professor of Genetics at Stanford University. Her research focuses on protein folding.

== Career ==
Frydman attended the University of Buenos Aires, earning a PhD in biochemistry. After graduating, she did a postdoctoral fellowship in the lab of Ulrich Hartl at Memorial Sloan Kettering. She is currently the Donald Kennedy Chair in the School of Humanities & Sciences and Professor of Genetics at Stanford University.

Her research focuses on protein folding. Her laboratory discovered the molecular chaperone TRiC/CCT and determined its mechanism and function for protein folding.

She was elected as a Fellow of the American Academy of Arts & Sciences in 2018, and as a Fellow of the Biophysical Society in 2019. In 2017, she was given the American Society for Biochemistry and Molecular Biology–Merck Award. She is an editor of the Journal of Cell Biology.

In 2021, she was elected member of the U. S. National Academy of Sciences.
