= The Ragnarök Conspiracy =

2012 thriller novel by Erec Stebbins

- Author: Erec Stebbins
- Cover artist: Nicole Sommer-Lecht
- Language: English
- Genre: Thriller, Political thriller, Conspiracy fiction, Spy fiction
- Publisher: Prometheus Books
- Publication date: October 2012
- Publication place: United States
- Media type: Print (Paperback), ebook(Amazon Kindle, Barnes & Noble Nook)
- Pages: 350 pp (First edition)
- ISBN: 9781616147129

The Ragnarök Conspiracy is the 2012 debut thriller novel by biomedical scientist Erec Stebbins, and the first novel in the Intel 1 Series of thrillers. The novel is about a Western terrorist organization attempting to instigate a global war with the Islamic world. A group of FBI and CIA agents work together to uncover and stop their plot. The Ragnarök Conspiracy follows two main characters, an "American Bin Laden" and an FBI agent, who both suffer a terrible loss on 9/11, but clash over how to respond to terrorist threats from radicalized Muslims.

== Characters ==
- John Savas - An FBI Special Agent in Charge of Intel 1, who lost his son on 9/11 and must work with a Muslim CIA agent in order to foil a global terrorist plot.
- William Gunn - Defense contracting magnate who lost his wife in the 9/11 attacks and pursues a global war against Islam in retaliation.
- Husaam Jordan - Muslim CIA agent who uncovers an international arms ring supplying the terrorist group.
- Rebecca Cohen - Lead information specialist at FBI special division Intel 1 who develops a romantic relationship with the protagonist, John Savas.
- Larry Kanter - Division Chief overseeing special counterterrorism unit Intel 1.
- Angel Lightfoote - Eccentric member of Intel 1 central to solving many of their cases.

== Reviews ==
The Ragnarök Conspiracy has received mixed reviews. Author Jack King stated that the book was a "sweeping, gripping tale of terror," and author William Greenleaf stated that the "thriller is filled with exciting events from beginning to end." The book was also reviewed by the Library Journal, Booklist and Publishers Weekly. Some have praised the unusual twist on a terrorist plot ("turns the traditional terrorist thriller on its head") and "well-rounded characters". Critical comments have characterized the prose as "clunky" and the themes as "heavy-handed." The novel has been compared to the works of Vince Flynn.
