= John Collison =

Irish-American entrepreneur (born 1990)

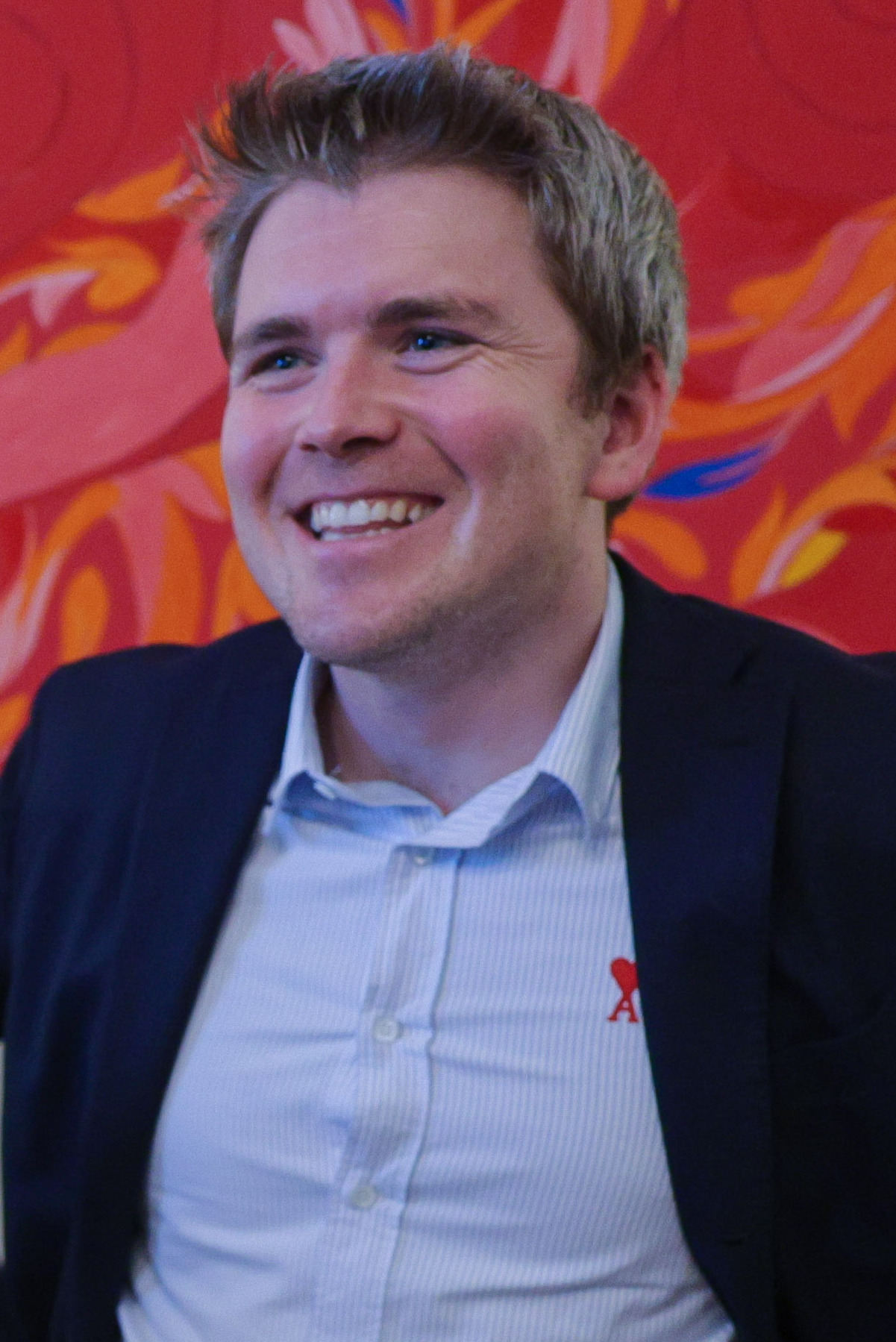
- Collison in 2023
- Born: August 1990 (age 36); Limerick, Ireland
- Education: Castletroy College; Harvard University (dropped out)
- Known for: Croma; Stripe
- Relatives: Patrick Collison (brother)

John Collison (born August 1990) is an Irish entrepreneur. He is the president of Stripe, which he co-founded in 2010 with his brother Patrick. Collison was the youngest self-made billionaire in 2016. As of 2026, according to Bloomberg Billionaires Index, his net worth is estimated at US$9.3 billion.

== Early life and education ==
Collison was born in Limerick, Ireland, in August 1990 to microbiologist Lily and electronic engineer Denis Collison. He and his brothers were brought up in the small village of Dromineer in County Tipperary. In 2007, he founded "Shuppa" (Note: "Shuppa" is a phonetic representation of the Irish language word, siopa, meaning shop.) with his elder brother Patrick in Limerick. The company later merged with Auctomatic, a software company that built tools for the eBay platform and funded by Y Combinator. Collison later moved to Silicon Valley. Auctomatic was acquired for $5 million in March 2008, when Collison was 17.

In 2009, Collison, having returned to finish secondary school at Castletroy College, received eight A1 and two A2 grades in the Irish Leaving Certificate examination. He enrolled at Harvard University in September 2009, but dropped out the following year. Collison is a pilot and a pianist.

== Career ==
In 2010, Collison co-founded Stripe, which received backing from Elon Musk, Peter Thiel, Max Levchin, and Sequoia Capital.

In November 2016, the Collison brothers became the world's youngest self-made billionaires, worth at least $1.1 billion, after an investment in Stripe from CapitalG and General Catalyst valued the company at $9.2 billion. In the same year, 2016, Collison was ranked by Forbes the 15th in the list America's Richest Entrepreneurs Under 40.

In 2018, Stripe, under the direction of the Collison brothers, contributed $1 million to California YIMBY, a pro-housing development lobbying organisation. The Collison brothers are citizens of Ireland.

In 2021 and 2022, Collison bought the Abbeyleix Estate and the derelict Millbrook House, neighbouring properties in County Laois, Ireland. He has stated he will spend several millions of euros over some years restoring Millbrook House to make a family home.

=== Forbes article ===
A profile of the brothers published in Forbes in 2021 claimed the brothers had "escaped" from Limerick, describing it as a "warzone" because of a gang feud and it was "the 'murder capital' of Europe". It claimed "shootings, pipe bomb attacks, and stabbings" happened there every night. It also claimed that "Some bad neighbourhoods are even walled off by a dirty graffitied 10-foot-high barrier, like the Berlin Wall".

The article received a lot of publicity online, causing a backlash. Patrick tweeted "Not only mistaken about Limerick but the idea of 'overcoming' anything is crazy. We are who we are because we grew up where we did". Collison tweeted it was "daft". Patrick O'Donovan called on the magazine and author to apologise to the people of Limerick "or the insult and hurt caused" by it. He also tweeted "I am calling on them to come to Limerick where I will gladly set the record straight in respect of what our county and city has to offer as opposed to what your work of fiction depicts," and "Please let me know when suits to visit." Niall Collins tweeted that the article was a "disgraceful description of Limerick, home to so many fine and decent people". The article was removed from the website on 9 April 2021.

=== Podcast ===
In 2025 Collison debuted a new podcast called "A Cheeky Pint" featuring interviews with leaders in the tech industry.
