= Eli Fenichel =

American economist

Eli P. Fenichel is an American economist and endowed professor at Yale University. He is known for his work on natural resource economics. Fenichel served as the Assistant Director for Natural Resource Economics and Accounting at the White House Office of Science and Technology Policy (OSTP) from 2021 to 2023.

== Education and Early Life ==
Fenichel holds a Ph.D. in Fisheries and Wildlife, a PhD certificate in Environmental Economics, and a M.S. in Agricultural Economics from Michigan State University. Before joining Yale, he was an assistant professor at Arizona State University. He is a former U.S. Peace Corps Volunteer

== Academic career ==
At Yale University, Fenichel is a faculty member in the School of the Environment, where his work centers on linking economics and ecology. He has published on bioeconomic modeling, sustainability metrics, valuation of natural capital and of ecosystem services, and the economics of infectious disease. Fenichel teaches courses in natural resource economics, natural capital, sustainable development, applied math, and data science.

=== Bioeconomic modeling ===
Fenichel's contributions to bioeconomic modeling focus on understanding ecological-economic thresholds and tipping points.

=== Natural capital valuation ===
Fenichel and his colleague Joshua K. Abbott created new methods for measuring the value of natural resources as assets or capital. These methods have been applied to reef fish, groundwater, Baltic Sea fisheries, caribou, forests, and other systems. Fenichel has also published generalized reviews on this topic.

=== National accounting and wealth-based sustainability metrics ===
Fenichel has also contributed to understanding the use of natural capital measures in national accounting systems and sustainability metrics. He was also a contributing author to the World Bank’s 2024 Changing Wealth of Nations Report and co-lead on the report for the High Level Panel for the Sustainable Ocean Economy’s blue paper on national accounting for the ocean.

=== Contributions to the economics of infectious disease ===
Fenichel has also worked on the economics of infectious disease. His early research on infectious disease focused on wildlife and livestock diseases. During the 2009 A/H1N1 (swine) flu epidemic, he began working on the economics of human infectious disease and published theoretical papers on economics of social distancing behavior.

Fenichel has written numerous reviews on the economics of wildlife and livestock disease and the economics of human infectious disease.

== Public Service and Policy ==
From 2021 to 2023, Fenichel served as Assistant Director at the White House Office of Science and Technology Policy as part of the Biden administration. He played a role in developing and promoting the National Strategy to Develop Statistics for Environmental-Economic Decisions, released in 2023.

Fenichel also participated in updating the Office of Management and Budgets circular A-4 and developing guidance for measure ecosystem services in benefit-cost analysis.

Fenichel has served on advisory councils including the Science Advisory Board for the Beijer Institute of Ecological Economics (Royal Swedish Academy of Sciences) and the WHO Technical Advisory Group on Economics for Environment. He has also served as a Scientific Review Committee Member for the National Socio-Environmental Synthesis Center.

== Honors and Recognition ==
In addition to holding the Knobloch Family chair in Natural Resource Economics at Yale, Fenichel has been a visiting fellow at the Grantham Institute on Climate Change and the Environment and a global fellow at the Smart Prosperity Institute.

In 2025, Fenichel was awarded the Frontiers Planet Prize National Champion award and the paper of enduring quality award by the Agricultural and Applied Economics Association. In 2020, he won the best paper award from the theory section of the Ecological Society of America and the most cited paper award from the Society of Population Ecology.
