= Stripe, LLC =

American multinational financial services and SaaS company

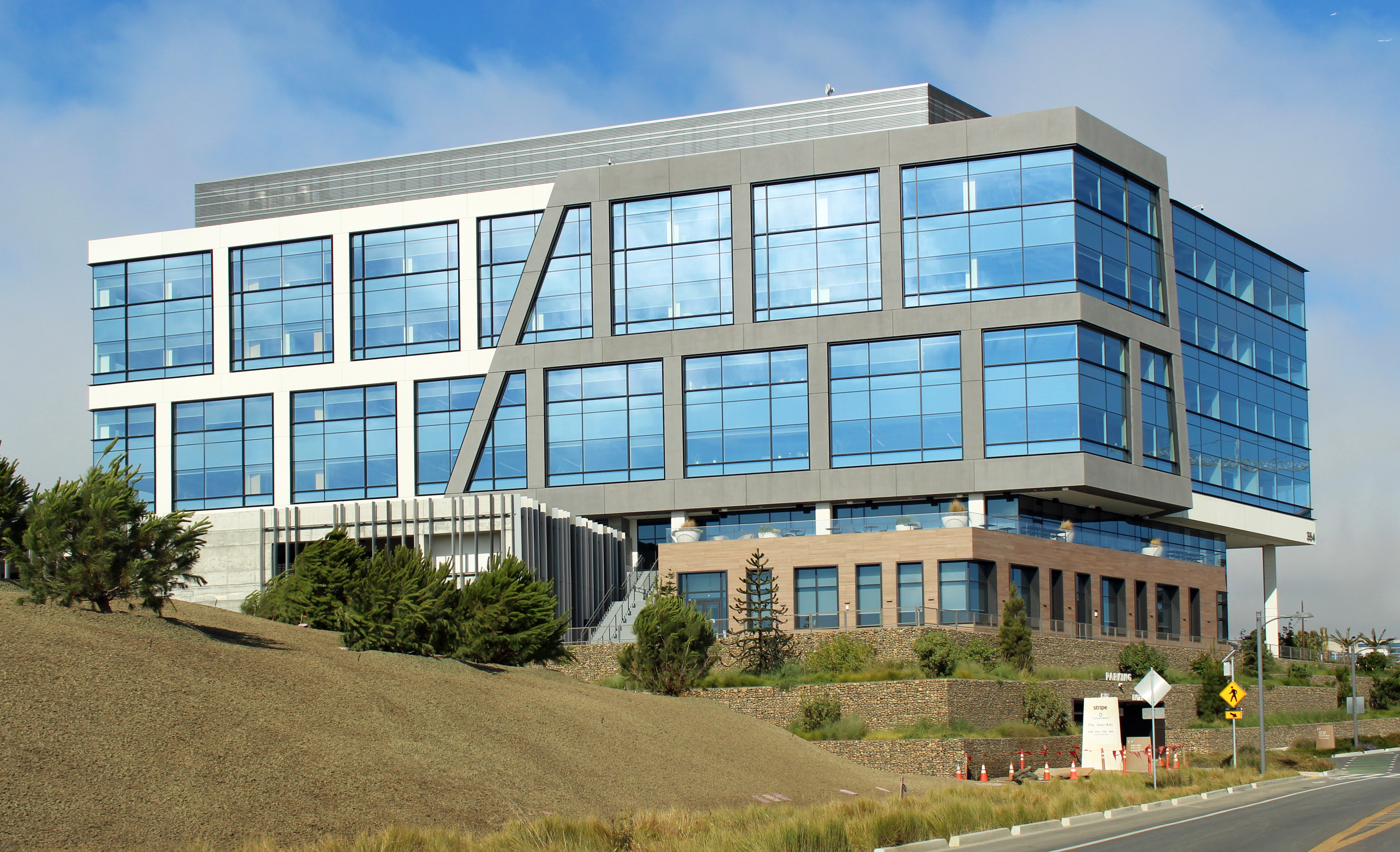
- Headquarters in South San Francisco
- Type: Private
- Industry: Financial services; Payment processor
- Founded: 2009; 17 years ago
- Founders: Patrick Collison; John Collison
- Headquarters: South San Francisco, California, U.S. and Dublin, Ireland
- Services: Payments; Billing; Connect; Sigma; Atlas; Radar (fraud prevention); Issuing; Terminal; Crypto; Usage-based billing; Tax
- Revenue: ▲US$5.1 billion (2024)
- Number of employees: 8,500 (2025)
- Subsidiaries: OpenRouter
- Website: stripe.com

Stripe, LLC is an Irish-American multinational financial services and software as a service (SaaS) company dual-headquartered in South San Francisco, California, United States, and Dublin, Ireland. The company primarily offers payment-processing software and application programming interfaces for e-commerce websites and mobile applications.

Stripe is the largest privately owned financial technology company, with a valuation of about $159 billion and over $1.9 trillion in payment volume processed in 2025, processing transactions for 5 million businesses in that year.

== History ==
Irish entrepreneur brothers John and Patrick Collison founded Stripe in Palo Alto, California, in 2010, and serve as the company's president and CEO, respectively. In 2011 the company received a $2 million investment, including contributions from Elon Musk, PayPal founder Peter Thiel, Irish entrepreneur Liam Casey, and venture capital firms Sequoia Capital, Andreessen Horowitz, and SV Angel.

In March 2013, Stripe made its first acquisition, Kickoff, a chat and task-management application. In 2012 the company moved from Palo Alto to San Francisco. In October 2019, the company announced that it would be moving from the South of Market area to Oyster Point in the neighbouring city of South San Francisco in 2021. In February 2021, Mark Carney, former governor of the Bank of Canada and of the Bank of England, was appointed to the company's board. Carney stepped down from his role with the company in 2025 in order to run for the leadership of the Liberal Party of Canada.

Stripe acquired accountancy platform Recko in October 2021 whose solution was to be added to Stripe's existing suite of financial tools.

In January 2022, Stripe entered a five-year partnership with Ford Motor Company. Through the deal, Stripe would handle transactions for consumer vehicle orders and reservations. That same month, Stripe partnered with Spotify to help the company monetize subscriptions. In April 2022, Twitter announced that it would partner with Stripe, Inc. (digital payments processor) for piloting cryptocurrency pay-outs for limited users in the platform.

In April 2022, Stripe announced its strategic partnership with UK-based financial technology company ION. The Wall Street Journal reported in July 2022 that the company's internal share price had fallen, causing its implied valuation to drop from $95 billion to $74 billion. In November 2022, the company announced it intended to initiate layoffs, terminating some 14% of its workforce.

Throughout 2022 and 2023, the company announced a number of large enterprise customers, including Airbnb, Amazon, Microsoft, Uber, BMW, Maersk, Zara, Lotus, Alaska Airlines, Le Monde, and Toyota. The company also announced in March 2023 that OpenAI is working with Stripe to commercialize its generative AI technology.

In January 2025, Stripe sent layoff notices to nearly 300 workers, primarily affecting roles in Product, Operations and Engineering. The company experienced controversy when the company sent a cartoon picture of a duck to the laid-off employees. Stripe's Chief People Officer Rob McIntosh later apologized for the mistake.

After re-enabling cryptocurrency pay-ins in April 2024, starting with USDC, Stripe completed the acquisition of Bridge in February 2025. The acquisition of the two-year-old stablecoin platform company is valued at $1.1 billion. In June 2025, the company acquired Privy, which powers crypto wallets.

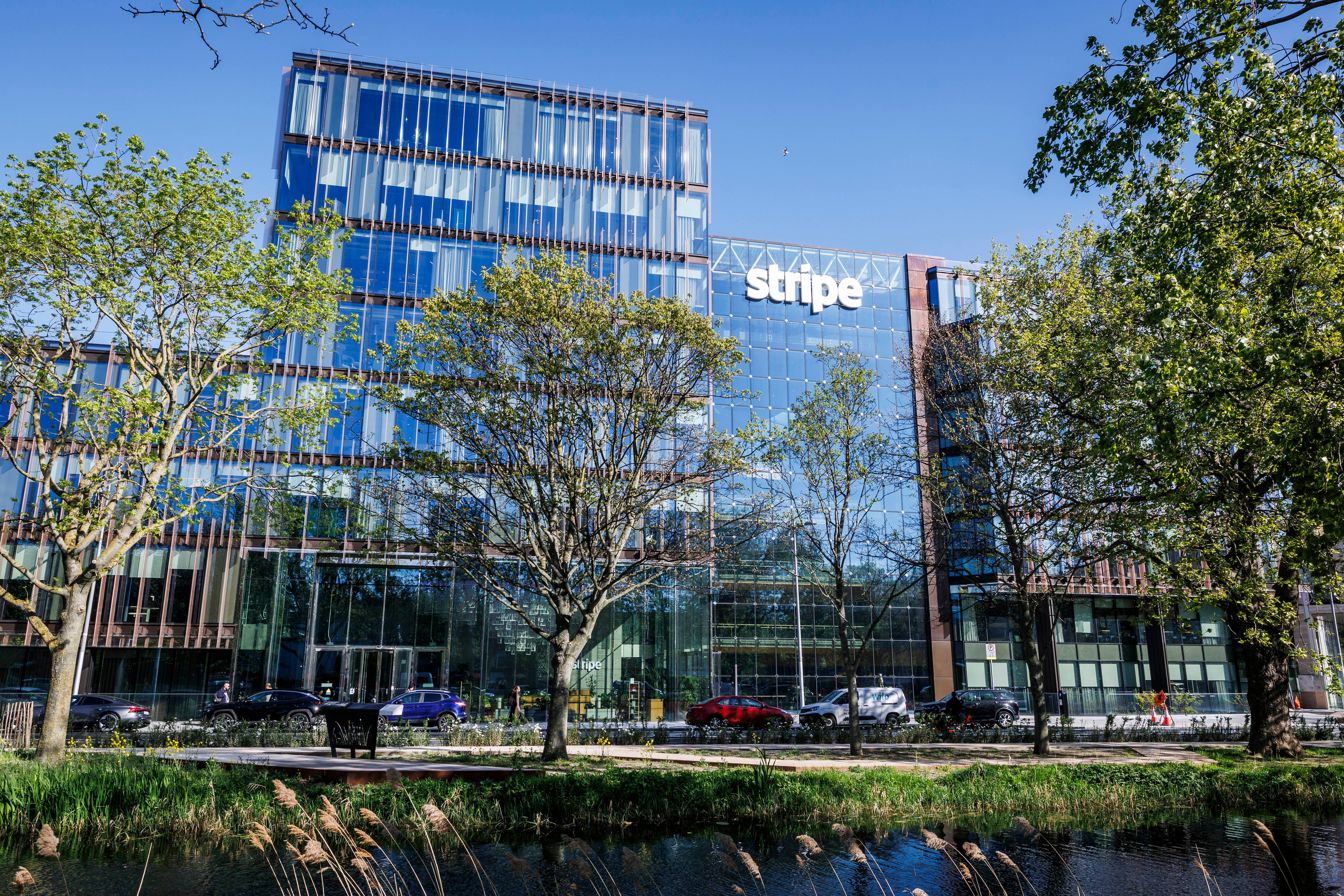
Dublin headquarters

In September 2025, Stripe announced it was powering Instant Checkout in ChatGPT and released Agentic Commerce Protocol for agentic commerce, which was co-developed with OpenAI. In October 2025, the company opened its second headquarters in Dublin, Ireland.

In February 2026, Stripe was valued at $159 billion in a tender offer posted for employees and shareholders. The tender offer was about a 70% increase from Stripe's previous valuation published in February 2025, where it was valued at $91.5 billion. Stripe also announced that its total volume increased to $1.9 trillion USD in 2025, a 34% increase from 2024.

On July 15, 2026, Stripe and private equity firm Advent International announced a $53 billion joint bid for PayPal inc. In August 2026 Bloomberg and The Wall Street Journal reported that Stripe had finalized a deal to acquire OpenRouter for more than $7 billion.

That same year, Stripe also launched the stripecommunity.com website to facilitate the Stripe Community Builder program where Stripe advocates & volunteers lead community events. Community Builders get financial support & access to Stripe offices around the world with popular and frequent community events happening at cities like Singapore, Dhaka, Hyderabad & Jacksonville.

== Technology company ==
=== Payment processing ===
Stripe provides application programming interfaces that web developers can use to integrate payment processing into their websites and mobile applications. The company introduced Stripe Connect in 2012, a multiparty payments solution that lets software developers embed payments natively into their products.

In April 2018, Stripe released antifraud tools, branded "Radar", that block fraudulent transactions. The same year, it expanded its services to include a billing product for online businesses, allowing businesses to manage subscription recurring revenue and invoicing.

Stripe's point-of-sale service called Terminal was made available to US users on 11 June 2019. Terminal had previously been invitation-only. Terminal is currently available in Australia, Canada, France, Germany, Ireland, the Netherlands, New Zealand, Singapore, and the United Kingdom. The service offers physical credit-card readers designed to work with Stripe.

On 5 September 2019, Stripe launched a merchant cash-advance scheme called Stripe Capital. The scheme allows Stripe merchants to request an advance on future payments they expect to process through their Stripe merchant account.

In June 2021, the company launched Stripe Tax, a service to allow businesses to automatically calculate and collect sales tax, VAT, and GST, initially rolling out to 30 countries and all US states. As of 2025, it has been made available in 102 countries. In May that year, Stripe introduced Payment Links, a no-code product allowing businesses to create a link to a checkout page and begin accepting payments on social platforms or direct channels.

In January 2022, Stripe agreed to acquire Terminal manufacturing partner BBPOS, allowing the company to bring the hardware development of Terminal readers in-house. In February, it was announced as Apple's first partner on in-person Tap to Pay, which enables businesses to accept contactless payments using an iPhone and a partner-enabled iOS app. In May, Stripe announced Data Pipeline, a tool for Stripe users who store data with Amazon Redshift or Snowflake Data Cloud. Data Pipeline syncs Stripe data and reports with Amazon Redshift or Snowflake Data Cloud, where they can be queried in combination with other business information. That month, the company also introduced Stripe Financial Connections, enabling businesses to establish direct connections with their customers’ bank accounts to verify accounts for payments and pay-outs, check balances to reduce payment failures, and cut fraud by confirming bank account ownership. In September 2023, Stripe announced that its optimized checkout suite allowed businesses to offer their customers more than 100 payment methods.

In May 2025, Stripe announced a new AI foundational model for payments, and introduced stablecoin powered accounts.

=== Corporate finance ===
In July 2018, Stripe introduced Stripe Issuing, a product that allows online businesses and platforms to create their own physical and digital credit and debit cards.

=== Cryptocurrency ===
Stripe created a service allowing cryptocurrency websites to let customers buy cryptocurrency using fiat money. In 2025, Stripe introduced Open Issuance, a platform for businesses to issue stablecoins.

=== Atlas ===
On 14 February 2016, the company launched the Atlas platform to help start-ups register as US corporations, targeting foreign entrepreneurs. The platform was originally invitation-only. In March 2016, Cuba was added to the list of countries covered under the program. Originally, companies registered using Atlas were set up as Delaware-based C corporations. As of 30 April 2018, the option to be registered as limited liability companies was added. Companies set up using Atlas automatically had a business bank account and Stripe merchant account set up.

=== Link ===
In May 2021, Stripe launched Link, a service for saving and auto-filling payment details when paying via Stripe. The service supported payments in over 185 countries and Stripe reported plans to make it available to platform businesses through its API. In September 2025, Patrick Collison announced that Link had surpassed 200 million users.

=== Connect ===
In 2012, Stripe launched Stripe connect, a service to manage payments at scale, specifically targeting platform monetisation and payments.

=== Other ===
In 2018, Stripe started a publishing company named Stripe Press to promote ideas that support businesses.

In 2019, Stripe began offering loans and credit cards to businesses in the United States. The company stated that loans are approved automatically using machine-learning models, with no human intervention. The following year, the company introduced Stripe Treasury, which provides its platform users APIs to embed financial services, allowing their customers to send, receive, and store funds.

In October 2020, Stripe announced Stripe Climate, a service for businesses to fund atmospheric carbon research and capture. In 2022, Stripe started a new subsidiary called Frontier that would direct spending on carbon removal. It announced $925 million in funding from major Silicon Valley companies to fund start up companies performing carbon capture to kick-start the industry.

Stripe Identity, launched in June 2021, enables online businesses to verify user identities and is built on the same infrastructure used for Stripe's own risk and compliance program.

In 2022, Stripe acquired Works in Progress, an english language magazine focused on science, technology, economics, public policy, and other topics related to human progress.

In May 2022, Stripe launched Stripe Apps to allow businesses to simplify operations and combine fragmented workflows. Stripe also announced Financial Connections to help businesses connect to their customers’ bank accounts for verifying bank accounts, checking balances, and confirming account ownership.

== Stripe App Marketplace ==
In May 2022, Stripe announced the launch of an App Marketplace allowing users to customize Stripe with third-party app integrations. At launch, the Marketplace had over 50 apps including offerings from DocuSign, Dropbox, Intercom, Mailchimp, Ramp, and Xero. While the marketplace was launched in May, app installations were not available immediately.

The move followed Stripe's acquisition of OpenChannel, a company which built app ecosystems for businesses, in December 2021.

== Growth ==
In May 2011, Stripe received a $2 million investment from venture capitalists Peter Thiel, Elon Musk, Sequoia Capital, SV Angel, and Andreessen Horowitz. Stripe launched publicly in September 2011 after an extensive private beta.

In 2020 Stripe expanded its services to five new European markets: the Czech Republic, Romania, Bulgaria, Cyprus, and Malta.

On 15 October 2020, Stripe acquired Paystack, a Nigerian payment processor, in a deal reportedly worth over $200 million, with the aim of expanding its services into Africa.

In December 2020, Stripe announced plans to expand in Southeast Asia, China, India, and Japan. It increased its staff in the region by 200 employees.

In March 2021, Stripe raised another $600 million, reaching a valuation of $95 billion, aimed towards expanding its European headquarters.

In April 2021, Stripe acquired TaxJar, a provider of cloud-based tax services based in Massachusetts. Whilst details of the acquisition were not made public, the deal is thought to have been in the region of $200M. In March 2023, Stripe completed its Series I fundraise of more than $6.5 billion at a $50 billion valuation. The funds raised will be used to provide liquidity to current and former employees and address employee withholding tax obligations related to equity awards. The company has said it does not need this capital to run its business.

On 3 December 2025, Stripe acquired the usage-based billing platform Metronome.

== Investments ==
Stripe is reported to have participated in two funding rounds for Monzo, a "challenger bank" based in the U.K. Stripe's first investment in Monzo was reported on 6 November 2017, with a second investment in Monzo's Series E fundraising round reported on 10 October 2018. Monzo's valuation grew from approximately $350 million to $1.27 billion through these two rounds of fundraising. Stripe participated in a third round of funding for Monzo on 24 June 2019, which raised approximately $144 million in funding for Monzo at a valuation of approximately $2.5 billion.

Stripe has invested in companies offering similar services as themselves, but in different geographical regions. In August 2018, Stripe invested in PayStack, a Nigerian payment processor, and, in September 2019, invested in PayMongo, a Philippine payment processor. In February 2021, Stripe invested in Safepay, a Pakistani payment processor.

On 6 June 2019, Stripe led a $22.5 million fundraising round for Step, a financial services start-up offering fee-free bank accounts to teenagers.

On 26 March 2020, Stripe led a $20 million Series A fundraising round for Fast, a company creating a universal, one-click checkout service. Subsequently, Stripe led a $102 million Series B fundraising round for Fast on January 26, 2021. Fast shut down in April 2022.

On 3 November 2021, Stripe led a $4 million Series Seed fundraising round for Archive, a social listening and user-generated content platform.

In April 2022, Stripe Inc., Alphabet Inc., Shopify, McKinsey & Company, and Meta Platforms announced Frontier, a $925 million advance market commitment of carbon dioxide removal (CDR) from companies that are developing CDR technology over the next 9 years.

On 15 July 2024, it was reported that major Stripe investor Sequoia Capital offered its limited partners a chance to sell up to $861 million worth of shares in Stripe. This move, indicating confidence in Stripe's future despite the delayed IPO, was driven by Sequoia's efforts to provide liquidity to its investors amid a dry IPO market. Stripe's latest 409A valuation stood at $70 billion, solidifying its position as one of the most valued start-ups globally.

On 26 July 2024, Stripe acquired a Merchant of Record services start-up Lemon Squeezy.

On 19 August 2026, Stripe announced it has acquired AI startup OpenRouter for $7.5 billion.

== Litigation ==
In March 2026, the Federal Trade Commission issued a warning against Stripe and three other payment processing brands for debanking of law-abiding citizens over political, religious or certain law-abiding activities.

== See also ==
- Electronic commerce
- List of online payment service providers
- Payment gateway
- Payment service provider
- Subscription business model
