= James Mullen =

James, Jim or Jimmy Mullen may refer to:

- James Mullen (CEO) (born c. 1958), president and CEO of Biogen Idec
- James T. Mullen (1843–1891), Supreme Knight of the Knights of Columbus
- Jim Mullen (born 1945), Scottish guitarist
- Jim Mullen (businessman) (born 1970), British businessman, CEO of Ladbrokes
- Jimmy Mullen (footballer, born 1921) (1921–2002), Northern Irish footballer, Inside Forward for Barrow, Crystal Palace and Bristol City
- Jimmy Mullen (footballer, born 1923) (1923–1987), English international football player for Wolverhampton Wanderers
- Jimmy Mullen (footballer, born 1947), English football player for Rotherham United
- Jimmy Mullen (footballer, born 1952), former Sheffield Wednesday & Cardiff City player; former manager of Blackpool, Burnley & Walsall
- Jimmy Mullen (golfer) (born 1993), English golfer
- Jimmy Mullen (River City), fictional character in Scottish soap opera

== See also ==
- James Mullin (1846–1920) of the Fenian Brotherhood
- James Mullins (disambiguation)
