= Flagship Pioneering =

American life sciences venture capital company

- Type: Private
- Industry: Biotechnology, Venture capital
- Founded: 1999; 27 years ago
- Headquarters: Cambridge, Massachusetts, United States
- Key people: Noubar Afeyan (Co-Founder & CEO)
- Website: www.flagshippioneering.com

Flagship Pioneering is an American life sciences venture capital company based in Cambridge, Massachusetts that invests in biotechnology, life sciences, health and sustainability companies. Portfolio companies include Moderna, Indigo Agriculture, Inari Agriculture and Novomer. The firm both funds and incubates companies.

== History ==
The company was founded in Cambridge in 1999 by Noubar Afeyan and Ed Kania under the name NewcoGen (short for "new company generation"), but later changed its name to Flagship Ventures, and again in 2016 to Flagship Pioneering. Several of the initial partners and executives had previously been with the venture capital firm Morgan Holland.

In late 2010, Flagship formed Moderna, which focuses on drug discovery, drug development, and vaccine technologies based exclusively on messenger RNA (mRNA) technology, and which is famous for its COVID-19 vaccine.

In 2013, Flagship helped fund the creation of Editas Medicine to use CRISPR gene editing for the development of pharmacological therapies, originally based on the genetic engineering protein Cas9. Editas was founded by Feng Zhang, Jennifer Doudna, George Church, J. Keith Joung, and David R. Liu. Doudna would later win the Nobel Prize in Chemistry in 2020 for her work on CRISPR, but quit Editas in 2014 over legal differences over intellectual property.

== See also ==
- New Enterprise Associates
- Polaris Partners
