= CRISPR Therapeutics =

Swiss-American biotechnology company

CRISPR Therapeutics AG

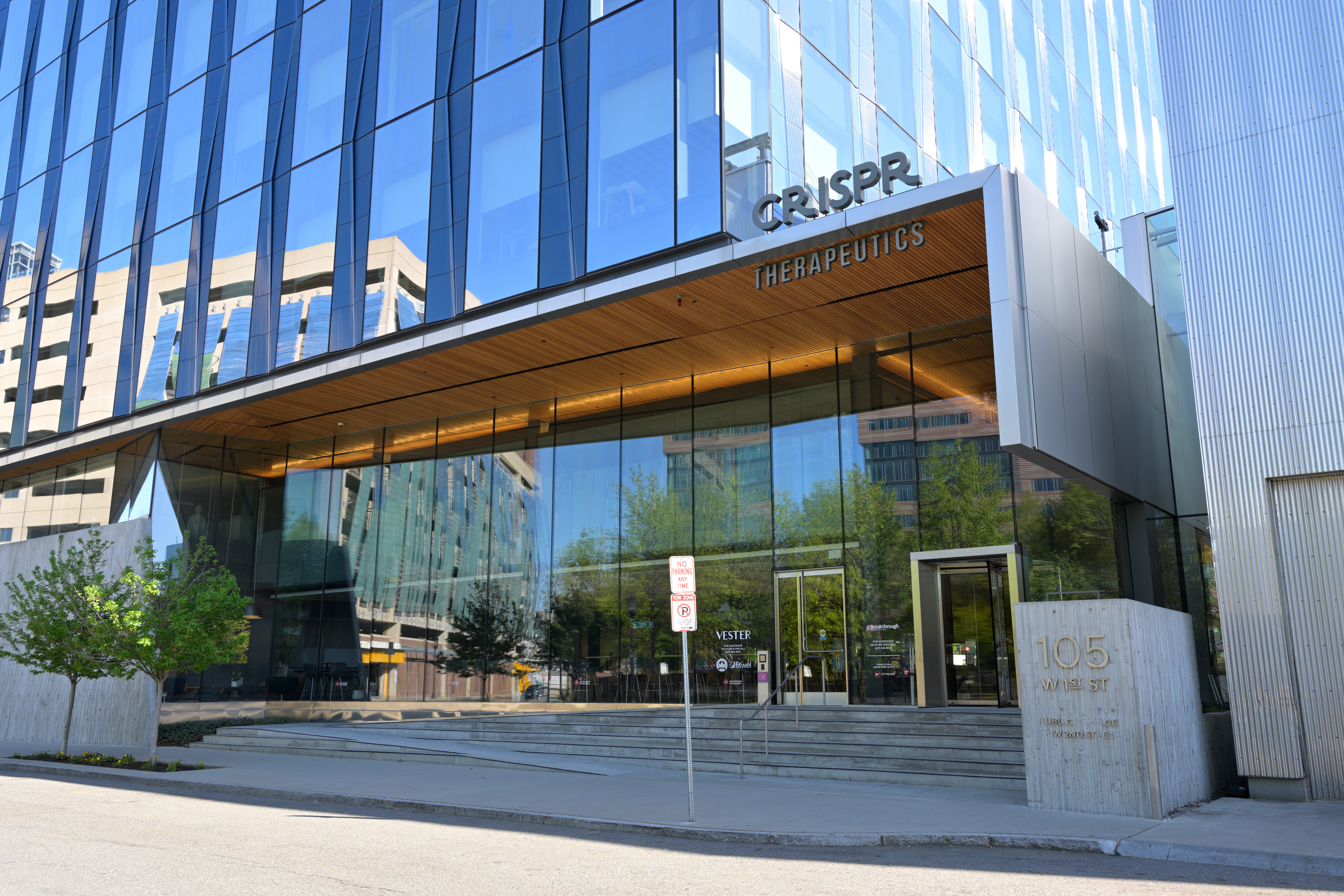
- A CRISPR Therapeutics office and R&D facility in Boston
- Formerly: Inception Genomics
- Type: Public
- Traded as: Nasdaq: CRSP
- ISIN: CH0334081137
- Industry: Biotechnology
- Founded: 2013; 13 years ago
- Founders: Emmanuelle Charpentier; Shaun Foy; Rodger Novak
- Headquarters: Zug, Switzerland
- Key people: Samarth Kulkarni (CEO)
- Revenue: ▼US$37.3 million (2024)
- Operating income: ▼US$−467 million (2024)
- Net income: ▼US$−366 million (2024)
- Total assets: ▲US$2.24 billion (2024)
- Total equity: ▲US$1.93 billion (2024)
- Number of employees: 393 (2024)
- Website: crisprtx.com

CRISPR Therapeutics AG is a Swiss–American biotechnology company headquartered in Zug, Switzerland. The company does business as CRISPR Therapeutics, Inc. in the United States. It was one of the first companies formed to utilize the CRISPR gene editing platform to develop medicines for the treatment of various rare and common diseases. The company has approximately 500 employees and has offices in Zug, Switzerland; Boston, Massachusetts; San Francisco, California; and London, United Kingdom. Its manufacturing facility in Framingham, Massachusetts, won the Facilities of the Year Award (FOYA) award in 2022. The company’s lead program, exagamglogene autotemcel, or exa-cel (formerly CTX001), was granted regulatory approval by the US Food and Drug Administration (FDA) in December 2023.

== History ==
CRISPR Therapeutics was founded in 2013 by Emmanuelle Charpentier, Shaun Foy and Rodger Novak. Charpentier later shared the Nobel Prize in Chemistry in 2020 with Jennifer Doudna. As part of a working group, she provided the first scientific documentation on the development and use of CRISPR gene editing. This allows DNA to be specifically modified and edited, which can be used to ameliorate diseases. CRISPR Therapeutics is applying this technology platform to research, develop and commercialize medicines for various diseases including sickle cell disease, beta thalassemia, various cancers, type 1 diabetes, and cardiovascular diseases. The CEO is Samarth Kulkarni, PhD, who joined the company in 2015 as chief business officer. Kulkarni became CEO in 2017.

CRISPR Therapeutics has formed collaborations in support of its mission of developing medicines. Vertex Pharmaceuticals and CRISPR Therapeutics entered into a strategic research collaboration in 2015 focused on the use of CRISPR/Cas9 to discover and develop potential new treatments aimed at the underlying genetic causes of human disease. One of the first treatments to emerge from the joint research program was CTX001 or exagamglogene autotemcel (commonly known as Exa-cel). Subsequently, CRISPR Therapeutics and Vertex expanded their collaboration to include diseases like Duchenne muscular dystrophy and type 1 diabetes. In 2016, the company signed an agreement with Bayer AG to operate Casebia Therapeutics as a joint venture with Bayer under the management of CRISPR Therapeutics. The company went public on the NASDAQ exchange in October 2016.

CRISPR Therapeutics has established partnerships with additional companies such as Viacyte (part of Vertex), Nkarta, Capsida, Curevac, and others.

== Products ==
CRISPR Therapeutics has drugs approved and in development for blood diseases, cancer, diabetes, and other severe diseases.

=== Exa-cel ===
Exa-cel is a drug therapy for the treatment of the rare blood disorders beta thalassemia and sickle cell disease developed jointly with Vertex Pharmaceuticals, that received FDA approval for clinical use in December 2023. In May 2020, exa-cel had received orphan drug designation from the US Food and Drug Administration (FDA) for transfusion-dependent beta thalassemia and from the European Medicines Agency for sickle cell disease and transfusion-dependent beta thalassemia. As of 2022 Phase 3 clinical trial results supported the safety and efficacy of this treatment. The rolling Biologics License Applications (BLAs) were submitted to the FDA for exa-cel for sickle cell disease and transfusion-dependent beta thalassemia. EU and UK filings were completed in 2022, and the submissions were validated by European Medicines Agency and The Medicines and Healthcare products Regulatory Agency as of April 2023.

=== CTX310 ===
CTX310 a CRISPR-Cas9 gene-editing therapy in development designed to permanently turn off the ANGPTL3 gene in the liver to lower bad cholesterol and triglycerides.

== See also ==
- Beam Therapeutics
- Editas Medicine
- Intellia Therapeutics
- Prime Medicine
