= Intrabody =

The word "intrabody" can be used in several contexts:

- Intrabody (protein), a type of antibody acting within a cell
- Pertaining to biological processes occurring within the body of a human or animal, such as cell signaling or movement of materials
- Pertaining to a phenomenon within the vertebral body, such as intrabody spinal disc herniation that extrudes material into the vertebral body
