= Diana Bautista =

American neuroscientist

Diana M. Bautista is an American neuroscientist known for her work on the molecular mechanisms underlying itch, touch and pain. She is a full professor of cell and developmental biology in the Department of Molecular and Cell Biology and is affiliated with the Helen Wills Neuroscience Institute at the University of California, Berkeley.

== Education and Scientific career ==
Bautista was raised in Chicago and was the first member of her family to graduate high school. While taking a break from pursuing a fine arts degree, she worked for an environmental group in Chicago, which sparked her interest in the intersection of chemistry, the environment and human disease. This lead her to the University of Oregon to study environmental science. While working in the laboratory of Peter O'Day, she became interested in cell signaling and the nervous system. O'Day encouraged her apply for graduate school where she eventually chose to join the laboratory of Richard Lewis at Stanford University. For her graduate studies, Bautista used electrophysiology and calcium imaging to characterize how plasma-membrane calcium-ATPase (PMCA) and Ca(2+) release-activated Ca(2+) (CRAC) channels regulate calcium levels in T-cells.

As a post-doctoral fellow in David Julius's lab, she characterized the response profiles of TRPA1 and TRPM8 and the molecular target of Sichuan peppers. Previously, Bautista helped show that allyl isothiocyanate, a pungent chemical found in wasabi and other mustard plants, potently activates TRPA1. In a subsequent study, she demonstrated that compounds found in garlic plants, allicin and DADs, also activate TRPA1. Interestingly, both allicin, DADs and allyl isothiocyanate share structurally similar motifs, suggesting that Allium and Brassica plants independently derived chemical mechanisms to activate TRPA1 to deter potential predators. TRPA1 is also targeted by environmental irritants like acrolein, which is found in tear gas and vehicle exhaust. Using TRPA1-deficient mice, she showed that TRPA1 is activated by acrolein, allicin and allyl isothiocyanate, which in turn depolarizes nociceptors and elicits inflammatory pain. Bautista also developed TRPM8-deficient mice to demonstrate, using electrophysiology and behavioral studies, that TRPM8 is the target of cold and menthol stimuli.

In 2008, Bautista started her own lab at University of California, Berkeley and is a Rita Allen Scholar.

== Awards and honours ==
- 2005-2010 Burroughs Welcome Fund Career Award in Biomedical Sciences
- 2008-2009 Sloan Foundation Research Fellowship
- 2009-2010 Hellman Family Faculty Fund Award
- 2009-2011 McKnight Endowment Fund for Neuroscience Scholar Award
- 2009-2013 Pew Scholar in the Biomedical Sciences
- 2010-2012 Rita Allen Foundation Pain Scholar
- 2010 Diana along with fellow UC Berkeley faculty member, Amy Herr received New Innovator Award by the National Institutes of Health.
- 2010-2012 Rita Allen Foundation Pain Scholar
- 2012 UC Berkeley Prytanean Faculty Award for outstanding research, teaching & outreach
- 2013 International Forum for the Study of Itch, Handwerker Prize for Research
- 2014 Along with Feng Zhang, an assistant professor at the Massachusetts Institute of Technology, The Young Investigator award was given by The Society for Neuroscience today
- 2016 HHMI Scholar 2016 UC Berkeley Class of 1949 Endowed Chair
