= Timothy Hayward (disambiguation) =

Timothy Hayward was an American politician.

Timothy or Tim Hayward may also refer to:

- Tim Hayward (born 1963), British food writer, broadcaster and restaurateur
- Tim Hayward (political scientist) (born 1955)
