= Beam Therapeutics =

American biotechnology company

Beam Therapeutics Inc.
- Type: Public
- Traded as: Nasdaq: BEAM; Russell 2000 component
- ISIN: US07373V1052
- Industry: Biotechnology
- Founded: 2017; 9 years ago
- Founders: David R. Liu; J. Keith Joung; Feng Zhang; Nicole Gaudelli; Alexis Komor
- Headquarters: Cambridge, Massachusetts, U.S.
- Key people: John Evans (CEO); Giuseppe Ciaramella (CSO)
- Revenue: ▲US$140 million (2025)
- Net income: ▲ −US$80.0 million (2025)
- Number of employees: 341 (December 31, 2021)
- Website: beamtx.com

Beam Therapeutics Inc. is an American biotechnology company conducting research in the field of gene therapies and genome editing. The company is headquartered in Cambridge, Massachusetts. In the development of therapies, the company relies on CRISPR base editing and prime editing, whereby single nucleotides in a DNA sequence can be enzymatically modified without producing double-strand breaks.

== History ==
Founded in 2017, the company traces its origins to the Broad Institute of the Massachusetts Institute of Technology and Harvard University. Co-founders include David R. Liu and Feng Zhang. Prior to its IPO, the company raised nearly $1 billion in venture capital from investors. In a February 2020 IPO, the company raised $180 million.

In January 2022, Pfizer and Beam Therapeutics announced a collaboration to develop therapies for rare diseases using CRISPR.

In 2026 clinical trial results were published on Beam's investigational medicine, ristoglogene autogetemcel, a CRISPR-based gene therapy for treatment of sickle cell disease.

== See also ==
- CRISPR Therapeutics
- Editas Medicine
- Intellia Therapeutics
- Prime Medicine
