= MHG =

MHG or mhg may refer to:

== Organisations ==
- Moscow Helsinki Group, a human rights organization in Russia
- Morgans Hotel Group, an operator of hotels
- Meredian Holdings Group, a biopolymer manufacturer

== Other uses ==
- Middle High German, a period in the history of the German language
- Mannheim City Airport (IATA code), Germany
- Marrgu language (ISO 639 code), an extinct Aboriginal language
- Monster Hunter Generations
- Miina Härma Gymnasium, a school in Tartu, Estonia

== See also ==
- Mars Hill Graduate School (MHGS), the former name of the Seattle School of Theology & Psychology, US
