= J. Keith Joung =

American pathologist and molecular biologist

J. Keith Joung is an American pathologist and molecular biologist who held the Robert B. Colvin Endowed Chair in Pathology at Massachusetts General Hospital and is Professor of Pathology at Harvard Medical School. He was a leading figure in the field of genome editing and had pioneered the development of designer nucleases and sensitive off-target detection methods.

== Education ==
In 1987, Joung graduated from Harvard College with a bachelor's degree in biochemical sciences. He received an M.D. from Harvard Medical School and a Ph.D. in genetics from Harvard University.

== Career ==
Joung is most well known for his work in genome editing and has contributed to the development of designer nucleases through protein engineering and assays for off-target detection. In the mid-2000s, his research was focused on creating zinc finger nuclease tools for biological research and gene therapy. He was the leader and founder of the Zinc Finger Consortium and co-authored a study on Oligomerized Pool Engineering (OPEN), a publicly available strategy for rapidly constructing multi-finger arrays.

More recently, he contributed to the development of the TAL effector, TALENs, and the RNA-guided CRISPR/Cas9 system. In addition to demonstrating the use of the CRISPR/Cas9 system in vivo through the zebrafish model, he pioneered the creation of tools such as GUIDE-seq and CIRCLE-seq to detect nuclease off-targets within the genome. In 2016, his group became one of the first to report engineered high-fidelity CRISPR/Cas9 nucleases (HF1) with no detectable off-target effects.

He is one of the scientific co-founders of Editas Medicine, along with Jennifer Doudna, Feng Zhang, George Church, and David Liu. He is also a co-founder of Beam Therapeutics and Verve Therapeutics. He received the Ho-Am Prize in Medicine in 2022 and the American Society of Gene and Cell Therapy Outstanding Achievement Award in 2023, the society's highest honor.
