= Timothy Hayward =

American politician (1941-2024)

Timothy Yeatman Hayward (September 9, 1941 – March 17, 2024) was an American Republican politician. He was an advisor of Jim Jeffords, Dick Snelling, and Jim Douglas. He was a member of the Vermont House of Representatives from 1976 to 1978.

== Early life and education ==
Hayward was born September 9, 1941, to Ruth Morison Faulkner and Richard Folsom Hayward. He had a sister (Ellen), a brother (James Duncan), and four half-brothers on his father's side (Geoffrey, Richard, Philip, and Jonathan).

Hayward grew up in Keene, New Hampshire, and Milton, Massachusetts. He graduated from the Milton Academy in 1960, then Middlebury College in 1964.

== Career ==
Hayward joined the United States Marine Corps in 1964 and served until 1967 as an officer, then captain.

After being released from the military, Hayward began a career in Vermont as a senior analyst/programmer at National Life Insurance Company, where he worked until February 1974.

While working at National Life Insurance Company, Hayward became involved in local politics, eventually serving on multiple committees from the town to state level. In 1974, he successfully managed Jim Jeffords's campaign for the United States House of Representatives. From 1976 to 1978, Hayward served as a member of the Vermont House of Representatives, after which he became a member of Republican Vermont Governor Dick Snelling's executive staff until 1985. In 1978, Hayword was asked to consider replacing the Vermont Republican State Committee's chairman James Mullin, but declined to do so. Hayword then served as the president of the Vermont Bankers Association, a position he held until 2002, at which point he rejoined Snelling's executive team.

Hayward was opposed to Republican candidate Donald Trump during the 2016 presidential election.

== Personal life and death ==
In June 1968, Hayward married Susan Cady, with whom he had three children: Heidi, Nathaniel, and Zachary. He kept several dogs. Hayward died on March 17, 2024, at the age of 82.
