= James Mullins =

James Mullins is the name of:

- James Mullins (American politician) (1807–1873), member of American House of Representatives
- James P. Mullins (born 1928), American military general
- James Patrick Mullins (1874–1965), member of Canadian Parliament

== See also ==
- Jim Mullin (born 1965), Canadian broadcaster
- James Mullin (1846–1920), of the Fenian Brotherhood
