= David R. Liu =

American molecular biologist, biochemist, and organic chemist (born 1973)

- 劉如謙
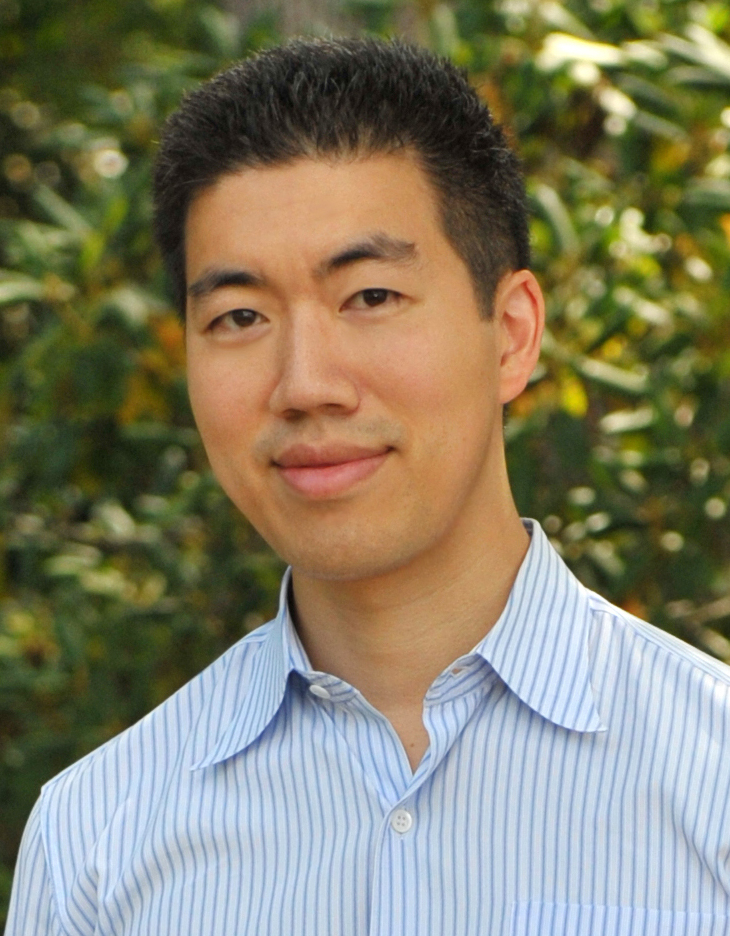
- Liu in 2012
- Born: June 12, 1973 (age 53); Riverside, California, U.S.
- Education: Harvard University (BA); University of California, Berkeley (PhD)
- Known for: Base editing Prime editing Nucleic acid templated chemistry Directed evolution DNA-templated organic synthesis
- Awards: ACS Award in Pure Chemistry (2006); King Faisal Prize (2022); Gabbay Award (2024) Breakthrough Prize in Life Sciences (2025); Harvey Prize (2025)
- Scientific career
- Fields: Organic chemistry Chemical biology Biochemistry
- Workplaces: Harvard University; Broad Institute; Wyss Institute; Howard Hughes Medical Institute
- Thesis: Expanding the Scope of Protein Mutagenesis (1999)
- Doctoral advisor: Peter G. Schultz
- Other academic advisors: Elias James Corey

Chinese name
- Traditional Chinese: 劉如謙
- Simplified Chinese: 刘如谦
Transcriptions
Standard Mandarin
- Hanyu Pinyin: Liú Rúqiān
- Bopomofo: ㄌㄧㄡˊㄖㄨˊㄑㄧㄢ
- Wade–Giles: Liu Ju-ch'ien

David Ruchien Liu (Chinese: 劉如謙; pinyin: Liú Rúqiān; born 1973) is an American molecular biologist, biochemist, and organic chemist who is the Thomas Dudley Cabot Professor of the Natural Sciences at Harvard University and the Richard Merkin Professor at the Broad Institute. He is known as the pioneer of multiple genetic engineering techniques, including base editing, prime editing, and DNA-templated organic synthesis.

Born to a Taiwanese American family, Liu graduated first in his class from Harvard College, where he studied chemistry and biology under Nobel Prize laureate Elias James Corey. After earning his doctorate from the University of California, Berkeley, Liu became a professor at Harvard at age 26. He served as the university's John L. Loeb Professor of the Natural Sciences from 2003 to 2004 and as a Harvard College Professor from 2007 to 2010.

Liu is a principal investigator at the Howard Hughes Medical Institute and the director of the Merkin Institute of Transformative Technologies in Healthcare at the Broad Institute. He has been elected to the National Academy of Sciences, the National Academy of Medicine, and the American Association for the Advancement of Science. In 2022, he was awarded the King Faisal Prize in Medicine for his contributions to gene editing. In 2025, he was awarded a Breakthrough Prize in Life Sciences for the development of base editing and prime editing, both fundamental gene-editing techniques.

== Early life and education ==
Liu was born to a Taiwanese American family in Riverside, California, on June 12, 1973. Both of his parents immigrated to the United States from Taiwan. His father is an aerospace engineer and his mother is a retired physics professor at the University of California, Riverside. As a child, Liu developed an interest in science after playing with insects in his backyard. He studied botany, entomology, and chemistry, often mixing household items to create improvised explosives.

Liu was raised in Riverside and attended Riverside Polytechnic High School, where he graduated as class valedictorian in 1990. While in high school, he took classes at the University of California, Riverside, and placed second in the national 1990 Westinghouse Science Talent Search for "using a computer to simulate how the brain processes visual information." That same year, he won the California Junior Science & Humanities Symposium, which enabled him to attend the awards ceremony for the 1990 Nobel Prize in Chemistry in Stockholm.

After high school, Liu attended Harvard University, where he excelled academically and graduated summa cum laude in 1994 with a Bachelor of Arts (B.A.) in chemistry, ranked first out of the 1,641 students at Harvard College. He had originally intended to study physics but, after studying under chemistry professors Stuart Schreiber, Gregory Verdine, and Joseph Grabowski, focused on synthetic chemistry and biochemistry instead. Grabowski later recommended Liu to Nobel laureate Elias James Corey for a research position in Corey's laboratory to study oxidosqualene cyclases.

As an undergraduate, Liu worked in Corey's synthetic chemistry laboratory and was elected to Phi Beta Kappa. He was awarded Harvard's 1994 Thomas T. Hoopes Prize for an outstanding senior thesis titled, "Studies on 2,3-Oxidosqualene Cyclase: A Synthetic and Molecular Biological Approach," and shared the prize with Corey, who described the thesis as being "absolutely word perfect" and “equivalent to a Ph.D. thesis.” Liu also won Harvard's Sophia Freund Prize for having its highest grade point average (GPA) and its Detur Prize for outstanding scholarship.

After graduating from Harvard, Liu received a National Defense Science and Engineering Graduate Fellowship and a fellowship from the Howard Hughes Medical Institute to pursue doctoral studies at the University of California, Berkeley. In his third year at Berkeley, he was influenced by Gerald Joyce to develop protein evolution techniques. He earned his Ph.D. from Berkeley in organic chemistry in 1999 under chemist Peter G. Schultz. His doctoral dissertation was titled, "Expanding the scope of protein mutagenesis."

== Academic career ==
While still in his fourth year of doctoral studies at Berkeley, Liu was invited by Corey to deliver a seminar at Harvard. According to Nature, "members of the chemistry faculty there were so impressed that they offered him a job as soon as he got his PhD". Skipping a postdoctoral fellowship, Liu was appointed an assistant professor of chemistry and chemical biology at Harvard at only age 26. He was promoted to an associate professor in 2003 and to a full professor in 2005. Liu also became a Howard Hughes Medical Investigator in 2005 and joined the JASONs, an elite group of academic science advisors to the U.S. government, in 2009. He was honored as a Harvard College Professor in 2007, in part for his undergraduate teaching. His introductory life sciences course, beginning in 2005, became Harvard's largest natural sciences course.

In 2017 and 2019, he was named to the Nature’s 10 researchers in world and to the Foreign Policy Leading Global Thinkers. In April 2019, Liu delivered a TED talk on base editing in Vancouver at TED2019, resulting in a standing ovation from the live audience. In 2019, prime editing was named as one of Nature's 10 remarkable papers from 2019 and one of The Scientist's top technical advances. In 2020, Liu earned the American Chemical Society David Perlman Award and the American Chemical Society ACS Chemical Biology Lectureship Award, was elected to the National Academy of Science (NAS), the National Academy of Medicine (NAM) and was named as a Fellow of the American Association for the Advancement of Science (AAAS). Liu was also awarded the 2025 Foundation for the National Institutes of Health Montrone-Seigel Prize in Biomedical Sciences (successor of the Lurie Prize), and the 2026 American Chemical Society Award for Creative Invention.

== Research ==
Liu's research group pioneered base editing, a new method of genome editing that enables the direct and precise conversion of a single base to another base in the genome of living cells, without making DNA double-stranded breaks (DSBs) that lead to complex mixtures of insertions, deletions, and DNA rearrangements. Liu's research group also pioneered prime editing, a versatile genome editing method that can install all possible base-to-base conversions, insertions, deletions, and combinations in mammalian cells without requiring double-strand DNA breaks or donor DNA templates. In 2025, Liu's team, in collaboration with the Sternberg Lab, reported a laboratory-evolved CRISPR-associated transposase for gene integration in human cells with high efficiency. This work complements other transposon-based methods from the Abudayyeh-Gootenberg Lab and Metagenomi.

Liu's lab has also worked on DNA-Templated Synthesis (DTS), generating some of the first examples of DNA-encoded libraries (DELs), now commonly used in drug discovery efforts in academia and in pharmaceutical companies. His lab also developed phage-assisted continuous evolution (PACE), a technique that uses the short 10-minute lifespan of M13 bacteriophage to achieve the rapid evolution of useful proteins. The lab has used PACE and its directed evolution efforts to generate new genome editing tools that allow for expanded DNA accessibility and DNA base conversions. He has published over 275 peer-reviewed publications and his H-index is ≥170 according to Google Scholar.

== Commercial activity ==
Liu co-founded Editas Medicine (genome editing with CRISPR nucleases for human therapeutics), Pairwise Plants (genome editing for agriculture), Beam Therapeutics (base editing for human therapeutics), Exo Therapeutics (novel small-molecule drug discovery), Resonance Medicine (novel enzymatic solutions for unmet challenges in medicine), and nChroma Bio (novel gene editing delivery technologies and genomic medicines that harness epigenetics). He is the scientific founder of Prime Medicine (prime editing for human therapeutics).

Liu also founded Permeon Biologics and Ensemble Therapeutics. Permeon Biologics was founded in 2011 by Liu and Flagship Ventures to develop a class of proteins to enable the transport of large molecules such as antibodies into cells to facilitate development of "intrabody" therapeutics and ceased its operations in 2015. Ensemble Therapeutics was founded in 2004 with funding from Flagship Ventures to develop Liu's work on macrocycles; the company raised about $40M and struck several pharmaceutical partnerships, but was shut down in 2017 before any of its lead compounds had reached the market.

== Personal life ==
Liu was the lead tester of Naughty Dog's 1994 video game Way of the Warrior, for which he also provided the voice of the character Chin "The Dragon" Liu. He was known to be a prolific professional Street Fighter II player, with Naughty Dog co-founder Andy Gavin saying that "He was one of those savant guys at Street Fighter who's just insanely good".

Liu gives away his entire salary to the students and biomedical researchers in his laboratory every Thanksgiving. He met his wife, Julie Liu, while attending the University of California, Berkeley.

== Selected papers ==
- Gartner, ZJ; Liu, DR (July 2001). "The generality of DNA-templated synthesis as a basis for evolving non-natural small molecules". J. Am. Chem. Soc. 123 (28): 6961–3. Bibcode:2001JAChS.123.6961G. doi:10.1021/ja015873n. PMC 2820563. PMID 11448217.
- Kanan, MW; Rozenman, MM; Sakurai, K; Snyder, TM; Liu, DR (2004). "Reaction discovery enabled by DNA-templated synthesis and in vitro selection". Nature. 431 (7008): 545–9. Bibcode:2004Natur.431..545K. doi:10.1038/nature02920. PMC 2814052. PMID 15457254.
- Gartner, ZJ; Tse, BN; Grubina, R; Doyon, JB; Snyder, TM; Liu, DR (September 2004). "DNA-templated organic synthesis and selection of a library of macrocycles". Science. 305 (5690): 1601–5. Bibcode:2004Sci...305.1601G. doi:10.1126/science.1102629. PMC 2814051. PMID 15319493.
- Georghiou, G; Kleiner, RE; Pulkoski-Gross, M; Liu, DR; Seeliger, MA (2012). "Highly specific, bisubstrate-competitive Src inhibitors from DNA-templated macrocycles". Nature Chemical Biology. 8 (4): 366–74. doi:10.1038/nchembio.792. PMC 3307835. PMID 22344177.
- Cronican, JJ; Thompson, DB; Beier, KT; McNaughton, BR; Cepko, CL; Liu, DR (2010). "Potent delivery of functional proteins into Mammalian cells in vitro and in vivo using a supercharged protein". ACS Chem. Biol. 5 (8): 747–52. doi:10.1021/cb1001153. PMC 2924640. PMID 20545362.
- Komor, AC; Kim, YB; Packer, MS; Zuris, JA; Liu, DR (19 May 2016). "Programmable editing of a target base in genomic DNA without double-stranded DNA cleavage". Nature. 533 (7603): 420–4. Bibcode:2016Natur.533..420K. doi:10.1038/nature17946. PMC 4873371. PMID 27096365.
- Kim, YB; Komor, AC; Levy, JM; Packer, MS; Zhao, KT; Liu, DR (April 2017). "Increasing the genome-targeting scope and precision of base editing with engineered Cas9-cytidine deaminase fusions". Nature Biotechnology. 35 (4): 371–376. doi:10.1038/nbt.3803. PMC 5388574. PMID 28191901.
- Gaudelli, NM; Komor, AC; Rees, HA; Packer, MS; Badran, AH; Bryson, DI; Liu, DR (23 November 2017). "Programmable base editing of A•T to G•C in genomic DNA without DNA cleavage". Nature. 551 (7681): 464–471. Bibcode:2017Natur.551..464G. doi:10.1038/nature24644. PMC 5726555. PMID 29160308.
- Lawrence, M. S.; Phillips, K. J.; Liu, D. R. (2007). "Supercharging Proteins Can Impart Extraordinary Resilience". J. Am. Chem. Soc. 129 (33): 10110–10112. doi:10.1021/ja071641y. PMC 2820565. PMID 17665911.
- McNaughton, B. R.; Cronican, J. J.; Liu, D. R. (2009). "Mammalian Cell Penetration, siRNA Transfection, and DNA Transfection by Supercharged Proteins". Proc. Natl. Acad. Sci. USA. 106 (15): 6111–6116. Bibcode:2009PNAS..106.6111M. doi:10.1073/pnas.0807883106. PMC 2659711. PMID 19307578.
- Esvelt, K. M.; Carlson, J. C.; Liu, D. R. (2011). "A System for the Continuous Directed Evolution of Biomolecules". Nature. 472 (7344): 499–503. Bibcode:2011Natur.472..499E. doi:10.1038/nature09929. PMC 3084352. PMID 21478873.
- Dickinson, B. C.; Leconte, A. M.; Allen, B.; Esvelt, K. M.; Liu, D. R. (2013). "Experimental Interrogation of the Path Dependence and Stochasticity of Protein Evolution Using Phage-Assisted Continuous Evolution". Proc. Natl. Acad. Sci. USA. 110 (22): 9007–9012. Bibcode:2013PNAS..110.9007D. doi:10.1073/pnas.1220670110. PMC 3670371. PMID 23674678.
- Maianti, J. P.; McFedries, A.; Foda, Z. H.; Kleiner, R. E.; Du, X.-Q.; Leissring, M. A.; Tang, W.-J.; Charron, M. J.; Seeliger, M. A.; Saghatelian, A.; Liu, D. R. (2014). "Anti-Diabetic Activity of Insulin-Degrading Enzyme Inhibitors Mediated by Multiple Hormones". Nature. 511 (7507): 94–98. Bibcode:2014Natur.511...94M. doi:10.1038/nature13297. PMC 4142213. PMID 24847884.
- Zuris, J. A.; Thompson, D. B.; Shu, Y.; Guilinger, J. P.; Bessen, J. L.; Hu, J. H.; Maeder, M. L.; Joung, J. K.; Chen, Z.-Y.; Liu, D. R. (2015). "Cationic Lipid-Mediated Delivery of Proteins Enables Efficient Protein-Based Genome Editing In Vitro and In Vivo". Nat. Biotechnol. 33 (1): 73–80. doi:10.1038/nbt.3081. PMC 4289409. PMID 25357182.
- Badran, A. H.; Guzov, V. M.; Huai, Q.; Kemp, M. M.; Vishwanath, P.; Kain, W.; Evdokimov, A.; Moshiri, F.; Turner, K. H.; Wang, P.; Malvar, T.; Liu, D. R. (2016). "Continuous Evolution of B. thuringiensis Toxins Overcomes Insect Resistance". Nature. 533 (7601): 58–63. doi:10.1038/nature17938. PMC 4865400. PMID 27120167.
- Gao, X.; Lamas, V.; Huang, M.; Yeh, W.-H.; Pan, B.; Hu, Y.-J.; Hu, J. H.; Thompson, D. B.; Shu, Y.; Li, Y.; Wang, H.; Yang, S.; Xu, Q.; Polley, D. B.; Liberman, M. C.; Kong, W.-J.; Holt, J. R.; Chen, Z.-Y.; Liu, D. R. (2018). "Treatment of autosomal dominant hearing loss by in vivo delivery of genome editing agents". Nature. 553 (7687): 217–221. Bibcode:2018Natur.553..217G. doi:10.1038/nature25164. PMC 5784267. PMID 29258297.
- Tang, W; Liu, D.R. (2018). "Rewritable multi-event analog recording in bacterial and mammalian cells". Science. 360 (6385) eaap8992. doi:10.1126/science.aap8992. PMC 5898985. PMID 29449507.
- Hu, J. H.; Miller, S. M.; Geurts, M. H.; Tang, W.; Chen, L.; Sun, N.; Zeina, C.; Gao, X.; Rees, H. A.; Lin, Z.; Liu, D. R. (2018). "Evolved Cas9 Variants with Broad PAM Compatibility and High DNA Specificity". Nature. 556 (7699): 57–63. Bibcode:2018Natur.556...57H. doi:10.1038/nature26155. PMC 5951633. PMID 29512652.
- Maianti, J. P.; McFedries, A.; Foda, Z. H.; Kleiner, R. E.; Du, X.-Q.; Leissring, M. A.; Tang, W.-J.; Charron, M. J.; Seeliger, M. A.; Saghatelian, A.; Liu, D. R. (2014). "Anti-diabetic activity of insulin-degrading enzyme inhibitors mediated by multiple hormones". Nature. 511 (7507): 94–98. Bibcode:2014Natur.511...94M. doi:10.1038/nature13297. PMC 4142213. PMID 24847884.
- Anzalone, A.V.; Randolph, P.B.; Davis, J.R.; Sousa, A.A.; Koblan, L.W.; Levy, J.M.; Chen, P.J.; Wilson, C.; Newby, G.A.; Raguram, A.; Liu, D.R. (2019). "Search-and-replace genome editing without double-strand breaks or donor DNA". Nature. 576 (7785): 149–157. Bibcode:2019Natur.576..149A. doi:10.1038/s41586-019-1711-4. PMC 6907074. PMID 31634902.
- Mok, B. Y; de Moraes, M. H; Zeng, J; Bosch, D. E; Kotrys, A. V; Raguram, A.; Hsu, F; Radey, M.C; Broko Peterson, B; Mootha, V.K; Mougous, J.D; Liu, D. R. (2020). "A bacterial cytidine deaminase toxin enables CRISPR-free mitochondrial base editing". Nature. 583 (7817): 631–637. doi:10.1038/s41586-020-2477-4. PMC 7381381. PMID 32641830.
- Arbab, Mandana; Shen, Max W.; Mok, Beverly; Wilson, Christopher; Matuszek, Żaneta; Cassa, Christopher A.; Liu, David R. (2020). "Determinants of Base Editing Outcomes from Target Library Analysis and Machine Learning". Cell. 182 (2): 463–480.e30. doi:10.1016/j.cell.2020.05.037. PMC 7384975. PMID 32533916.
- Koblan, Luke W.; Erdos, Michael R.; Wilson, Christopher; Cabral, Wayne A.; Levy, Jonathan M.; Xiong, Zheng-Mei; Tavarez, Urraca L.; Davison, Lindsay M.; Gete, Yantenew G.; Mao, Xiaojing; Newby, Gregory A.; Doherty, Sean P.; Narisu, Narisu; Sheng, Quanhu; Krilow, Chad; Lin, Charles Y.; Gordon, Leslie B.; Cao, Kan; Collins, Francis S.; Brown, Jonathan D.; Liu, David R. (28 January 2021). "In vivo base editing rescues Hutchinson–Gilford progeria syndrome in mice". Nature. 589 (7843): 608–614. doi:10.1038/s41586-020-03086-7. ISSN 0028-0836. PMC 7872200. PMID 33408413.
- Blum, Travis R.; Liu, Hao; Packer, Michael S.; Xiong, Xiaozhe; Lee, Pyung-Gang; Zhang, Sicai; Richter, Michelle; Minasov, George; Satchell, Karla J. F.; Dong, Min; Liu, David R. (19 February 2021). "Phage-assisted evolution of botulinum neurotoxin proteases with reprogrammed specificity". Science. 371 (6531): 803–810. doi:10.1126/science.abf5972. ISSN 0036-8075. PMC 8175023. PMID 33602850.
- Newby, Gregory A.; Yen, Jonathan S.; Woodard, Kaitly J.; Mayuranathan, Thiyagaraj; Lazzarotto, Cicera R.; Li, Yichao; Sheppard-Tillman, Heather; Porter, Shaina N.; Yao, Yu; Mayberry, Kalin; Everette, Kelcee A.; Jang, Yoonjeong; Podracky, Christopher J.; Thaman, Elizabeth; Lechauve, Christophe; Sharma, Akshay; Henderson, Jordana M.; Richter, Michelle F.; Zhao, Kevin T.; Miller, Shannon M.; Wang, Tina; Koblan, Luke W.; McCaffrey, Anton P.; Tisdale, John F.; Kalfa, Theodosia A.; Pruett-Miller, Shondra M.; Tsai, Shengdar Q.; Weiss, Mitchell J.; Liu, David R. (8 July 2021). "Base editing of haematopoietic stem cells rescues sickle cell disease in mice". Nature. 595 (7866): 295–302. doi:10.1038/s41586-021-03609-w. ISSN 0028-0836. PMC 8266759. PMID 34079130.
- Chen, Peter J.; Hussmann, Jeffrey A.; Yan, Jun; Knipping, Friederike; Ravisankar, Purnima; Chen, Pin-Fang; Chen, Cidi; Nelson, James W.; Newby, Gregory A.; Sahin, Mustafa; Osborn, Mark J.; Weissman, Jonathan S.; Adamson, Britt; Liu, David R. (2021). "Enhanced prime editing systems by manipulating cellular determinants of editing outcomes". Cell. 184 (22): 5635–5652.e29. doi:10.1016/j.cell.2021.09.018. PMC 8584034. PMID 34653350.
- Banskota, Samagya; Raguram, Aditya; Suh, Susie; Du, Samuel W.; Davis, Jessie R.; Choi, Elliot H.; Wang, Xiao; Nielsen, Sarah C.; Newby, Gregory A.; Randolph, Peyton B.; Osborn, Mark J.; Musunuru, Kiran; Palczewski, Krzysztof; Liu, David R. (2022). "Engineered virus-like particles for efficient in vivo delivery of therapeutic proteins". Cell. 185 (2): 250–265.e16. doi:10.1016/j.cell.2021.12.021. PMC 8809250. PMID 35021064.
- Arbab, Mandana; Matuszek, Zaneta; Kray, Kaitlyn M.; Du, Ailing; Newby, Gregory A.; Blatnik, Anton J.; Raguram, Aditya; Richter, Michelle F.; Zhao, Kevin T.; Levy, Jonathan M.; Shen, Max W.; Arnold, W. David; Wang, Dan; Xie, Jun; Gao, Guangping; Burghes, Arthur H. M.; Liu, David R. (21 April 2023). "Base editing rescue of spinal muscular atrophy in cells and in mice". Science. 380 (6642). doi:10.1126/science.adg6518. ISSN 0036-8075. PMC 10270003. PMID 36996170.
- Doman, Jordan L.; Pandey, Smriti; Neugebauer, Monica E.; An, Meirui; Davis, Jessie R.; Randolph, Peyton B.; McElroy, Amber; Gao, Xin D.; Raguram, Aditya; Richter, Michelle F.; Everette, Kelcee A.; Banskota, Samagya; Tian, Kathryn; Tao, Y. Allen; Tolar, Jakub; Osborn, Mark J.; Liu, David R. (2023). "Phage-assisted evolution and protein engineering yield compact, efficient prime editors". Cell. 186 (18): 3983–4002.e26. doi:10.1016/j.cell.2023.07.039. PMC 10482982. PMID 37657419.
- Mercer, Jaron A. M.; DeCarlo, Stephan J.; Roy Burman, Shourya S.; Sreekanth, Vedagopuram; Nelson, Andrew T.; Hunkeler, Moritz; Chen, Peter J.; Donovan, Katherine A.; Kokkonda, Praveen; Tiwari, Praveen K.; Shoba, Veronika M.; Deb, Arghya; Choudhary, Amit; Fischer, Eric S.; Liu, David R. (15 March 2024). "Continuous evolution of compact protein degradation tags regulated by selective molecular glues". Science. 383 (6688). doi:10.1126/science.adk4422. ISSN 0036-8075. PMC 11203266. PMID 38484051.
- Sousa, Alexander A.; Terrey, Markus; Sakai, Holt A.; Simmons, Christine Q.; Arystarkhova, Elena; Morsci, Natalia S.; Anderson, Laura C.; Xie, Jun; Suri-Payer, Fabian; Laux, Linda C.; Roze, Emmanuel; Forlani, Sylvie; Gao, Guangping; Frost, Simon; Frost, Nina; Sweadner, Kathleen J.; George, Alfred L.; Lutz, Cathleen M.; Liu, David R. (2025). "In vivo prime editing rescues alternating hemiplegia of childhood in mice". Cell. 188 (16): 4275–4294.e23. doi:10.1016/j.cell.2025.06.038.

== See also ==
- DNA‐Templated Organic Synthesis
