= CRISPR/Cas tools =

Computer software that aids design of guide RNAs for CRISPR gene editing

CRISPR-Cas design tools are computer software platforms and bioinformatics tools used to facilitate the design of guide RNAs (gRNAs) for use with the CRISPR/Cas gene editing system.

== CRISPR-Cas ==
The CRISPR/Cas (clustered regularly interspaced short palindromic repeats/CRISPR associated nucleases) system was originally discovered to be an acquired immune response mechanism used by archaea and bacteria. It has since been adopted for use as a tool in the genetic engineering of higher organisms.

Designing an appropriate gRNA is an important element of genome editing with the CRISPR/Cas system. A gRNA can and at times does have unintended interactions ("off-targets") with other locations of the genome of interest. For a given candidate gRNA, these tools report its list of potential off-targets in the genome thereby allowing the designer to evaluate its suitability prior to embarking on any experiments.

Scientists have also begun exploring the mechanics of the CRISPR/Cas system and what governs how good, or active, a gRNA is at directing the Cas nuclease to a specific location of the genome of interest. As a result of this work, new methods of assessing a gRNA for its 'activity' have been published, and it is now best practice to consider both the unintended interactions of a gRNA as well as the predicted activity of a gRNA at the design stage.

== Table ==
The below table lists available tools and their attributes.

List of CRISPR-Cas design tools
Tool Name	Provider	Searches whole genome for targets	Returns all targets of genome	Seed span and location can be defined	Maximum number of mismatches supported	Predicts gRNA activity	Available Protospacer adjacent motif (PAM) sequences	Annotation is reported	gRNA suggestion or scoring	Ref.
CRISPRon, CRISPRoff	Center for non-coding RNA in Technology and Health, University of Copenhagen	Yes	Yes	Yes	All	Yes	NGG, NGA, NAG	Yes	Yes	,
Invitrogen TrueDesign Genome Editor	Thermo Fisher Scientific	Yes	Yes	No	3	No	NGG	Yes	Yes	
Breaking-Cas	Spanish National Center for Biotechnology	Yes (over 1000 genomes)	Yes	Yes (by weights)	4	No	User customizable	Yes	Yes	
Cas-OFFinder	Seoul National University	Yes	Yes	No	0-10	No	NGG, NRG, NNAGAAW, NNNNGMTT	No	Yes	
CASTING	Caagle	Yes	Yes	No	3	No	NGG and NAG	No	Yes	
CRISPy	Technical University of Denmark	Yes	Yes	No	All	No	NGG	Yes	Yes	
CCTop	University of Heidelberg	Yes	Yes	Partial	5 (0-5)	Yes	NGG, NRG, NNGRRT, NNNNGATT, NNAGAAW, NAAAAC	Yes	Yes	
CHOPCHOP	Harvard University	Yes	Yes	Partial	0, 2	No	NGG, NNAGAA, NNNNGANN	No	Yes	
CHOPCHOP v2	University of Bergen	Yes	Yes	Yes	3 (0-3)	Yes	User customizable	Yes	Yes	
CRISPOR	University of California, Santa Cruz TEFOR	Yes (over 200 genomes)	Yes	No	4	Yes	NGG, NGA, NGCG, NNAGAA, NGGNG, NNGRRT, NNNRRT, NNNNGMTT, NNNNACA, TTTN	Yes	Yes	
CRISPR Design	Zhang Lab, MIT	Yes	No	No	4	No	NGG and NAG	mRNA exons	Yes	
CRISPRdirect	Database Center for Life Science (DBCLS)	Yes (over 200 species)	Yes	No	Any number	No	NNN	Yes	Yes	
CRISPRscan	Giraldez Lab, Yale	Yes	Yes	No	4	Yes	NGG, TTTV, TTTN	Yes	Yes	
CRISPRseek	Bioconductor	Yes	Yes	No	Any number	No	User customizable	mRNA exons	Yes	
DESKGEN	Desktop Genetics	Yes	Yes	Yes	Any number	Yes	Fully user customizable	Yes	Yes	
GuideScan	GuideScan	Yes	Yes	Yes	3 on website and customizable with command line	Yes	NGG/NAG on website and customizable with command line	Yes	Yes	
GT-Scan	CSIRO & EMBL-ABR	Yes	Yes	Yes	3 (0-3)	No	User customizable	Links to Ensembl genome browser	Yes	
Off-Spotter	Thomas Jefferson University	Yes	Yes	Yes	0-5		NGG, NAG, NNNNACA, NNGRRT (R is A or G)	mRNA exons, unspliced mRNA, mRNA, 5'UTR, CDS, 3'UTR, unspliced lincRNA, lincRNA	User customizable	
sgRNA Designer	Broad Institute	No	No	No	0	Yes	NGG	CDS (if searching by transcript ID)	Yes	
Synthego Design Tool	Synthego	Yes (over 120,000 genomes)	No (Optimized for Knockout)	Yes	3	Yes	NGG	Yes (RefSeq, Ensembl, Gencode)	Yes	
TUSCAN	CSIRO	No	No	No	0	Yes	NGG	No	Yes	
VARSCOT	CSIRO	Yes	Yes	No	0-8	Yes	User customizable	No	Yes	
CRISPR Targeted Gene Designer	Horizon Discovery	Yes, Multiple	yes	yes	4	Yes	NGG, NNGRRT, YTTV, other	Yes	Yes	(21)
GuideMaker	United States Department of Agriculture, Agricultural Research Service	Yes, any user supplied genome	Yes	Yes	0-5	Yes	Any PAM site and PAM orientation	Yes	Yes	
WGE	Wellcome Sanger Institute	Yes, human and mouse reference genomes	Yes	Yes	4 (0-4)	No	NGG	Yes	Yes	
