= Novomer =

- Novomer logo
- Founded: 2004
- Founder: Geoffrey Coates, KensaGroup LLC, Scott Allen
- Headquarters: Rochester, New York, United States
- Products: plastics
- Website: www.novomer.com

Novomer is a venture-funded chemistry technology development company. The company was founded in 2004 in Ithaca, New York, as a direct spin-off from Cornell University, building on pioneering research led by Professor Geoffrey W. Coates in the field of sustainable polymer chemistry.

Its core technology is a proprietary catalyst that enables carbon monoxide and ethylene oxide to be used as raw materials in the production of polymers and chemicals.

In August 2021, Novomer was acquired by Danimer Scientific with the goal of integrating Novomer’s advanced materials platform into a global portfolio of biodegradable and compostable plastics.

In March 2025, Danimer Scientific filed for Chapter 11 bankruptcy protection after warning that it may end up winding down its operations, and initiating the sale of various business assets including those belonging to Novomer.
