= Exagamglogene autotemcel =

Gene therapy

Clinical data
- Trade names: Casgevy
- Other names: CTX001, exa-cel
- AHFS/Drugs.com: Monograph
- MedlinePlus: a624018
- License data: US DailyMed: Exagamglogene autotemcel
- Routes of administration: Intravenous
- ATC code: B06AX05 (WHO)

Legal status
- Legal status: CA: ℞-only / Schedule D; UK: POM (Prescription only); US: ℞-only; EU: Rx-only; BH: Rx-only

Identifiers
- DrugBank: DB15572
- UNII: S53L777GM8
- KEGG: D12749

Exagamglogene autotemcel, sold under the brand name Casgevy, is a gene therapy used for the treatment of sickle cell disease and transfusion-dependent beta thalassemia. It was developed by Vertex Pharmaceuticals and Crispr Therapeutics.

The most common side effects include low levels of platelets and white blood cells, mouth sores, nausea, musculoskeletal pain, abdominal pain, vomiting, febrile neutropenia (fever and low white blood cell count), headache, and itching.

The treatment was approved for medical use in the United Kingdom in November 2023, in Bahrain in December 2023, in the United States in December 2023, in the European Union in February 2024, and in Canada in August 2025. Exagamglogene autotemcel is the first cell-based gene therapy treatment utilizing CRISPR/Cas9 gene editing technology to be approved by the US Food and Drug Administration.

== Medical uses ==
In the UK and Bahrain, exagamglogene autotemcel is indicated for the treatment of transfusion-dependent beta thalassemia and sickle cell disease in people aged 12 years and older who should be treated with hematopoietic stem cell transplantation but for whom a suitable stem cell donor is not available.

In the US, exagamglogene autotemcel is indicated for the treatment of sickle cell disease in people aged twelve years and older with recurrent vaso-occlusive crises, and for the treatment of people with transfusion-dependent beta-thalassemia. In July 2026, the indication for exagamglogene autotemcel in the US was expanded to include people aged two years of age and older with either sickle cell disease with recurrent vaso-occlusive crises or transfusion-dependent beta thalassemia. This is the first gene therapy approved for people aged two years of age and older with sickle cell disease.

The gene therapy is made from the recipient's own blood stem cells, which are modified, and are given back as a one-time, single-dose infusion as part of a hematopoietic (blood) stem cell transplant. Prior to treatment, the recipient's own stem cells are collected, and then the recipient must undergo myeloablative conditioning (high-dose chemotherapy), a process that removes cells from the bone marrow so they can be replaced with the modified cells in exagamglogene autotemcel. The modified blood stem cells are transplanted back into the recipient where they engraft (attach and multiply) within the bone marrow and increase the production of fetal hemoglobin (HbF), a type of hemoglobin that facilitates oxygen delivery.

== Side effects ==
The most common side effects observed in clinical studies include low levels of platelets and white blood cells, mouth sores, nausea, musculoskeletal pain, abdominal pain, vomiting, febrile neutropenia (fever and low white blood cell count), headache and itching.

== History ==
The safety and effectiveness of exagamglogene autotemcel were evaluated in an ongoing single-arm, multi-center trial in adult and adolescent participants with sickle cell disease. Participants had a history of at least two protocol-defined severe vaso-occlusive crises during each of the two years prior to screening. The primary efficacy outcome was freedom from severe vaso-occlusive crisis episodes for at least twelve consecutive months during the 24-month follow-up period. A total of 44 participants were treated with exagamglogene autotemcel. Of the 31 participants with sufficient follow-up time to be evaluable, 29 (93.5%) achieved this outcome. All treated participants achieved successful engraftment with no participants experiencing graft failure or graft rejection.

The US Food and Drug Administration (FDA) granted the application for exagamglogene autotemcel priority review, orphan drug, fast track, and regenerative medicine advanced therapy designations. The FDA granted approval of Casgevy to Vertex Pharmaceuticals.

== Society and culture ==
=== Legal status ===
The treatment was authorized in the United Kingdom for the treatment of sickle cell disease and transfusion-dependent beta thalassemia in November 2023. It was approved in the Kingdom of Bahrain to treat sickle-cell anemia and beta thalassemia in December 2023. It was approved in the United States for the treatment of sickle cell disease in December 2023 and for the treatment of transfusion-dependent beta thalassemia in January 2024.

In December 2023, the Committee for Medicinal Products for Human Use (CHMP) of the European Medicines Agency adopted a positive opinion, recommending the granting of a conditional marketing authorization for the medicinal product Casgevy, intended for the treatment of transfusion‑dependent β‑thalassemia and sickle cell disease. As Casgevy is an advanced therapy medicinal product, the CHMP positive opinion is based on an assessment by the Committee for Advanced Therapies. The applicant for this medicinal product is Vertex Pharmaceuticals (Ireland) Limited. Exagamglogene autotemcel was authorized for medical use in the European Union in February 2024.

=== Economics ===
The therapy has a US list price of US$2.2 million. The cost effectiveness threshold of the therapy in the US is estimated to be between $1.35 million and $2.05 million depending on perspective (healthcare vs limited societal) and assuming the willingness to pay for 1 quality-adjusted life year (QALY) at $100,000–$150,000.

The UK price is estimated to be £1 million.
