= Editas Medicine =

Discovery-phase pharmaceutical company

Editas Medicine, Inc.
- Formerly: Gengine, Inc.
- Type: Public
- Traded as: Nasdaq: EDIT; Russell 2000 component
- Industry: Biotechnology; Genome engineering; Pharmaceutical
- Founded: November 2013; 13 years ago, in Cambridge, Massachusetts
- Founders: Jennifer Doudna; Feng Zhang; George Church; David R. Liu; J. Keith Joung
- Headquarters: Cambridge, Massachusetts, United States
- Number of locations: 2
- Key people: James Mullen (chairman); Gilmore O'Neill (president and CEO)
- Revenue: ▲US$40.52 million (2025)
- Operating income: ▼US$−160.01 million (2025)
- Net income: ▼US$−160.06 million (2025)
- Total assets: ▼US$514 million (2022)
- Total equity: ▼US$361 million (2022)
- Number of employees: 226 (2023)
- Website: editasmedicine.com

Editas Medicine, Inc., (formerly Gengine, Inc.) is a clinical-stage biotechnology company that is developing therapies for rare diseases using CRISPR gene editing technology. Editas Medicine headquarters is located in Cambridge, Massachusetts with additional facilities in Boulder, Colorado.

== History ==
Editas Medicine was founded as Gengine, Inc. in September 2013 by Feng Zhang of the Broad Institute, Jennifer Doudna of the University of California, Berkeley, and George Church, David Liu, and J. Keith Joung of Harvard University, with funding from Third Rock Ventures, Polaris Partners and Flagship Ventures. The name was renamed Editas Medicine two months later. Doudna left the company in June 2014 over legal disagreements concerning intellectual property rights related to Cas9.

In August 2015, the company raised $120 million in Series B funding from Bill Gates and 13 other investors. It went public on 2 February 2016 via a $94 million initial public offering.

Editas entered into a strategic collaboration with Juno Therapeutics in 2015 to develop chimeric antigen receptor and high-affinity T cell receptor therapies for the treatment of cancer. Juno was later acquired by Celgene, which was subsequently acquired by Bristol Myers Squibb.

In 2015, the company announced plans for a clinical trial using CRISPR gene-editing techniques to treat Leber congenital amaurosis type 10 (LCA10), a rare genetic disorder that causes blindness. On 30 November 2018, the FDA authorized to start the trials, under the investigational name EDIT-101 (also known as AGN-151587). In September 2021, Editas stated that preliminary results from clinical trials were promising and support clinical benefits of EDIT-101 treatment. In March 2020, Editas became the first company to attempt CRISPR-based DNA editing inside a person's body (in vivo), in partnership with Allergan.

a patient with severe vision loss caused by Leber congenital amaurosis received an intravitreal injection containing a harmless virus carrying CRISPR gene-editing instructions. Five months later, Editas revised its agreement with AbbVie, the parent company of Allergan and regained full rights to their range of eye disease treatment therapies, including EDIT-101 for the treatment of LCA10.

In 2019, the company was building new chemistry facilities in Boulder, Colorado.

Katrine Bosley was CEO until 2019, when she was replaced by board member Cynthia Collins. Collins was replaced in 2021 by James Mullen, who had been board chairman. Gilmore O'Neill, former CMO of Sarepta Therapeutics, became CEO on June 1, 2022, with Mullen staying on as executive chairman of the board.

On December 12, 2024, Editas ended the development of reni-cel and laid off 65% of its employees.

== Research ==
Editas works with two different CRISPR nucleases, Cas9 and Cas12a.

EDIT-101 is a CRISPR based gene therapy for treatment of Leber congenital amaurosis, currently in clinical trials.

EDIT-301 is an experimental potential treatment utilizing the firm's CAS 12a editing technology for sickle cell disease and beta-thalassemia. In 2019 the firm reported early success in research on the drug;. In December 2020, it filed an IND application for treatment of sickle cell disease. In January 2021, it said it had received clearance from the FDA for phase 1 safety studies.
