= Feng Zhang =

Chinese–American biochemist (born 1981)

- 张锋
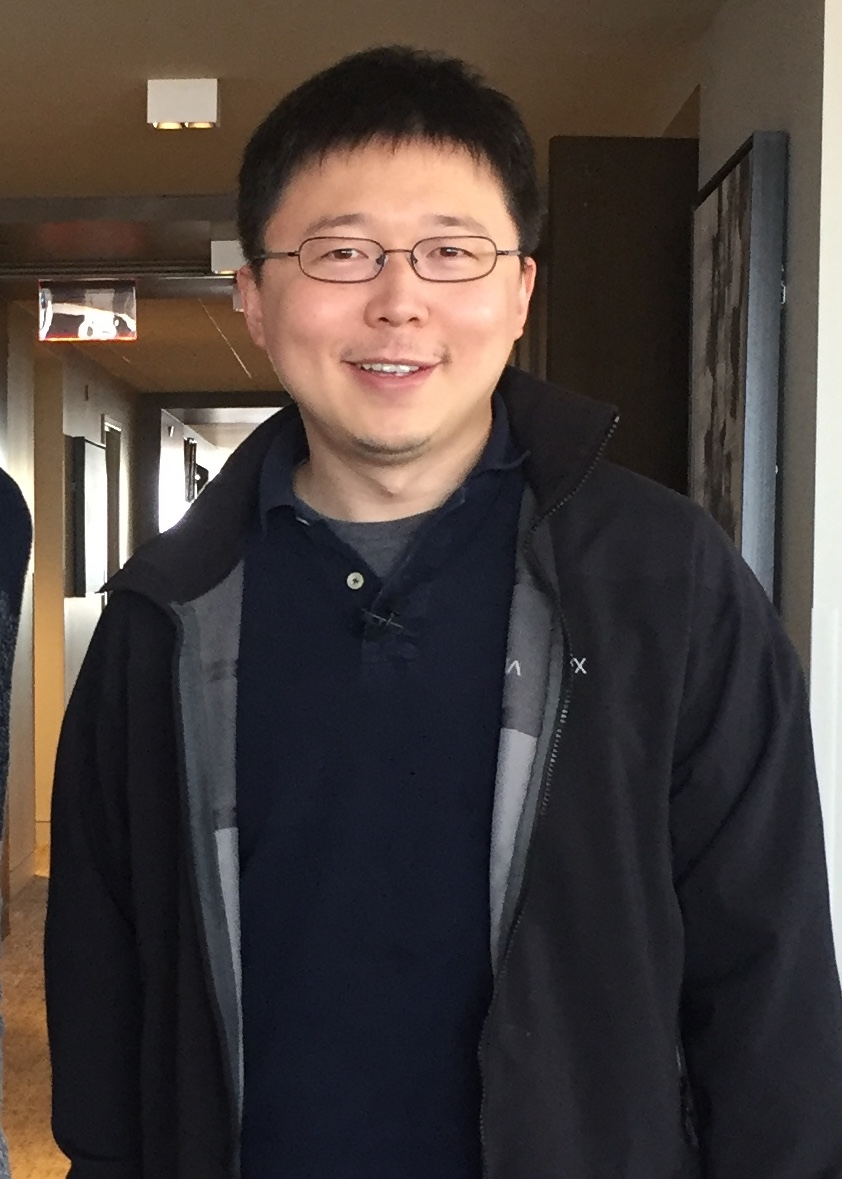
- Zhang in 2017
- Born: October 22, 1981 (age 44); Shijiazhuang, Hebei, China
- Education: Harvard University (BA); Stanford University (PhD)
- Known for: Optogenetics, CRISPR
- Awards: National Inventors Hall of Fame (2026); National Medal of Technology and Innovation (2025); Edward Novitski Prize (2021); Harvey Prize (2018); Keio Medical Science Prize (2018); National Academy of Sciences (2018); American Academy of Arts & Sciences (2018); Lemelson-MIT Prize (2017); Albany Medical Center Prize (2017); Gairdner Foundation International Award (2016); Tang Prize (2016); Tsuneko & Reiji Okazaki Award (2015); Alan T. Waterman Award (2014); Gabbay Award (2014); NIH Director’s Pioneer Award (2012); Perl-UNC Prize (2011)
- Scientific career
- Fields: Neuroscience; Bioengineering
- Workplaces: Massachusetts Institute of Technology; Broad Institute; McGovern Institute for Brain Research
- Thesis: Circuit-breakers: optical technologies for probing neural signals and systems (2009)
- Doctoral advisor: Karl Deisseroth
- Other academic advisors: Xiaowei Zhuang, Paola Arlotta, George Church
- Doctoral students: Silvana Konermann, Patrick Hsu
- Website: zlab.mit.edu

Feng Zhang
- Simplified Chinese: 张锋
- Traditional Chinese: 張鋒
Transcriptions
Standard Mandarin
- Hanyu Pinyin: Zhāng Fēng
- IPA: [ʈʂáŋ fə́ŋ]

Feng Zhang (Chinese: 张锋; pinyin: Zhāng Fēng; born October 22, 1981) is a Chinese-born American biochemist and neuroscientist. He is the James and Patricia Poitras Professor of Neuroscience at the Massachusetts Institute of Technology and a core institute member of the Broad Institute of MIT and Harvard. He also holds appointments as an investigator at the McGovern Institute for Brain Research, as a professor in the MIT Department of Brain and Cognitive Sciences and Department of Biological Engineering, and as an HHMI investigator. Zhang is most well known for his central role in the development of optogenetics and CRISPR technologies. In 2025, he was awarded National Medal of Technology and Innovation, the highest honor the United States confers for achievements related to technological progress.

== Early life and education ==
Zhang was born in China in 1981, where both his parents were computer programmers. At age 11, he moved to Iowa with his mother. He attended Theodore Roosevelt High School and Central Academy in Des Moines, graduating in 2000. As a high school student, Zhang participated in the Research Science Institute (RSI) summer program at MIT in 1999. He was a finalist at the International Science and Engineering Fair (ISEF) in 1998 and 1999 and placed third in the Westinghouse Science Talent Search (STS) in 2000.

Zhang earned his B.A. in chemistry and physics in 2004 from Harvard University, where he worked with Xiaowei Zhuang. He then received his PhD in chemical and biological engineering from Stanford University in 2009 under the guidance of Karl Deisseroth where he developed the technologies behind optogenetics with Edward Boyden. He subsequently served as an independent Junior Fellow in the Harvard Society of Fellows (2009-2010).

== Research ==
Zhang's lab is focused on using synthetic biology to develop technologies for genome and epigenome engineering to study neurobiology. As a postdoc, he began work on using TAL effectors to control gene transcription.

Based on previous work by Sylvain Moineau's lab, Zhang began work to harness and optimize the CRISPR system to work in human cells in early 2011. Zhang's group compared their RNA expression approach with a design of chimeric RNA for use in human cells and established features of the guide necessary for Cas9 function in mammalian cells that are dispensable in biochemical assays. Zhang, Doudna, and colleagues from Harvard founded Editas Medicine in September 2013 to develop and commercialize CRISPR-based therapies.

Zhang discovered Cas13 with NCBI investigator Eugene Koonin using computational biology methods. In 2016, Zhang cofounded Arbor Biotechnologies to develop Cas13 for therapeutic use.

His lab has also developed a CRISPR-based diagnostic nucleic acid detection protocol termed SHERLOCK (Specific High sensitivity Enzymatic Reporter UnLOCKing) that is able to detect and distinguish strains of viruses and bacteria present in as low as attomolar (10^{−18} M) concentration. Zhang cofounded Sherlock Biosciences in 2018 to further develop this diagnostic technology.

Also in 2018, Zhang cofounded Beam Therapeutics with Editas cofounder and Harvard colleague David R. Liu to further advance Liu's work on base editing and prime editing.

In 2023, the first CRISPR/Cas9-based therapeutic, based on a design Zhang developed in 2015, was approved for clinical use to treat sickle cell disease. Also in 2023, Zhang cofounded Aera Therapeutics, focused on lipid nanoparticles and protein nanoparticles for T-cell targeting therapy.

In 2025, Zhang's lab discovered TIGR-Tas, a family of RNA-guided DNA-targeting systems with potential applications for genome editing.

== Honors ==
Zhang is a recipient of the NIH Director's Pioneer Award and a 2012 Searle Scholar. He was named one of MIT Technology Reviews's TR35 in 2013. His work on optogenetics and CRISPR has been recognized by a number of awards, including: the 2011 Perl-UNC Prize (shared with Boyden and Deisseroth); the 2014 Alan T. Waterman Award, the National Science Foundation's highest honor that annually recognizes an outstanding researcher under the age of 35; the 2014 Gabbay Award (shared with Jennifer Doudna and Emmanuelle Charpentier); the 2014 Young Investigator Award from the Society for Neuroscience (shared with Diana Bautista) as well as the ISTT Young Investigator Award from the International Society for Transgenic Technologies. Zhang also received a New York Stem Cell Foundation (NYSCF) – Robertson Stem Cell Investigator Award in 2014, and was named the 2016 NYSCF – Robertson Stem Cell Prize Recipient.

In 2015, Zhang became the inaugural recipient of Tsuneko & Reiji Okazaki Award (Nagoya University) and in 2016, he was once again (for the 2nd and 3rd time) sharing honors with Doudna and Charpentier when receiving the Gairdner Foundation International Award and the Tang Prize.

In 2016, he became a laureate of the Asian Scientist 100 by the Asian Scientist.

In 2017, he received the Albany Medical Center Prize (jointly with Emmanuelle Charpentier, Jennifer Doudna, Luciano Marraffini, and Francisco Mojica) and the Lemelson-MIT Prize.

In 2018, Zhang was elected as a Fellow of the American Academy of Arts and Sciences, and a member of the National Academy of Sciences, National Academy of Medicine.

In 2019, he received the Harvey Prize of the Technion/Israel for the year 2018 (jointly with Emmanuelle Charpentier and Jennifer Doudna). In the same year, Zhang received the Golden Plate Award of the American Academy of Achievement.

Zhang's research on CRISPR-Cas9 gene editing, while significant, was not recognized by the Nobel Prize committee in 2020, which instead awarded the prize to Emmanuelle Charpentier and Jennifer Doudna for their groundbreaking work on the subject.

In 2021, he received the Richard Lounsbery Award.

In 2025, Zhang and Doudna were both recipients of the National Medal of Technology and Innovation.

In 2026, Zhang was inducted into the National Inventors Hall of Fame.

As of 2026, Zhang serves on the board of trustees of non-profit organizations Society for Science and Center for Excellence in Education.
