= James Mullen (CEO) =

James C. “Jim” Mullen (born c. 1958) is an American business executive. He is the executive chairman at genome editing company Editas Medicine since 2018, where he was CEO between 2021 and 2022. He was formerly the president and CEO of Biogen Idec until he retired effective June 8, 2010. At the same time, he started he would retire from the board at the end of his term. In 2011, he was named CEO to drug manufacturer Patheon, based in Durham, North Carolina, as well as to their board. He stayed there until August 29, 2017.

== Education ==
Mullen has a Bachelor of Science in chemical engineering from Rensselaer Polytechnic Institute and a Master of Business Administration from Villanova University. He has been a trustee at Villanova since 2001.

== Biogen ==
Mullen began at Biogen in 1992 and worked his way up. In 1992, he became the VP of Operations followed by VP international in 1996. Mullen became COO and president in 1999 and CEO in 2000. In 2003, he became CEO of Biogen Idec. His tenure as CEO has been described this way: "Although the firm flourished in the early part of his tenure, it has struggled more recently to coax new products from its pipeline. In a May proxy filing, Carl Icahn noted that Mullen was paid $60.8 million in total compensation, combining salary, bonus, and stock options over the preceding five years, while Biogen’s stock declined from $66.61 to $47.63 [40% in value] in that time." In 2005, the last time they brought a new drug to market (multiple sclerosis treatment Tysabri). Tysabri was "quickly pulled from the market after it was linked to a life-threatening brain infection in a handful of patients". When it returned in 2008, it brought in $589 million which was far less than anticipated. This led to Carl Icahn, an activist investor, demanding changes as he tried to gain more control over the board.
