= Prime Medicine =

American biotechnology company

Prime Medicine, Inc.
- Type: Public
- Traded as: Nasdaq: PRME
- ISIN: US74168J1016
- Industry: Biotechnology
- Founded: 2019; 7 years ago
- Founders: David R. Liu; Andrew Anzalone
- Headquarters: Cambridge, Massachusetts, U.S.
- Key people: Allan Reine (CEO); David R. Liu (Co-founder and Scientific Advisory Board member)
- Website: primemedicine.com

Prime Medicine, Inc. is an American biotechnology company developing gene therapies based on prime editing. The company is headquartered in Cambridge, Massachusetts.

== Pipeline ==
In May 2024, Prime Medicine announced that the U.S. FDA had accepted its IND application for PM359, a gene therapy involving transplantation of autologous CD34+ stem cells modified by prime editing ex vivo. PM359 also received Rare Pediatric Disease and Orphan Drug designations from the FDA. A Phase 1/2 open-label clinical trial of PM359 in patients with chronic granulomatous disease (CGD) caused by mutations in the neutrophil cytosolic factor 1 (NCF1, also known as p47phox) gene began in October 2024, making PM359 the first prime editor to enter the clinic. Following an announcement of preliminary results in May 2025, Prime Medicine and its clinical collaborators reported in December 2025 that two CGD patients treated with PM359 had been "effectively cured" of the disease.

In May 2025, Prime Medicine announced that it would prioritize clinical development programs for the treatment of Wilson's disease and alpha-1 antitrypsin deficiency (AATD), two of the most common genetic liver diseases. In September 2026, the company announced that the U.S. FDA had accepted its IND application for PM647, a prime editor designed to correct the E342K (Pi*Z) mutation in the SERPINA1 gene, the most common cause of AATD.

== Partnerships ==
In January 2024, Prime Medicine announced a partnership with the Cystic Fibrosis Foundation, with Prime Medicine receiving $15 million in funding towards the development of prime editing-based therapies for cystic fibrosis. An additional $24 million commitment from the foundation was announced in July 2025.

In September 2024, Prime Medicine announced a partnership with Bristol Myers Squibb to develop optimized prime editing reagents for ex vivo T cell therapies. Prime Medicine received $110 million upfront and is eligible for up to $3.5 billion in milestone payments.

== See also ==
- Beam Therapeutics
