= Amy Herr =

American professor of Bioengineering

Amy E. Herr
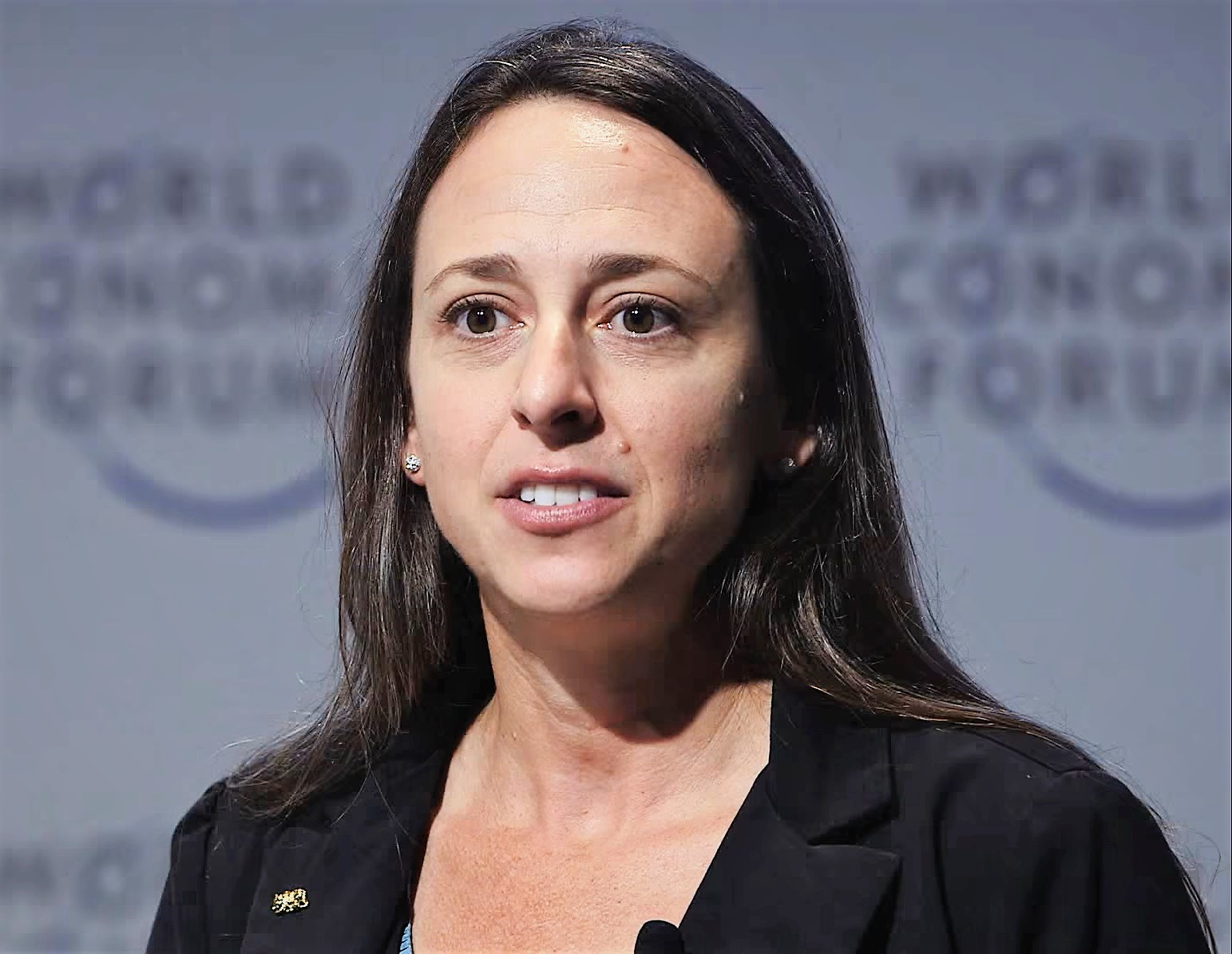
- Herr speaks at the World Economic Forum in 2021
- Born: Ohio, U.S.
- Occupations: Professor of Bioengineering, University of California, Berkeley Co-Founder, Zephyrus Biosciences

Academic background
- Education: Caltech, Stanford University

Amy Elizabeth Herr is an American professor. She is the John D. and Catherine T. MacArthur Professor at the University of California, Berkeley, where she is attached to the Department of Bioengineering. At Berkeley she was also the founding executive director of the Bakar Bioenginuity Hub. Herr is a Chan Zuckerberg BioHub Investigator and the Chief Technology Officer of the Chan Zuckerberg Biohub Network, a fellow of both the National Academy of Inventors and the American Institute of Medical and Biological Engineering, as well as a co-founder of Zephyrus Biosciences, a biotechnology company that was acquired by Bio-Techne.

== Early life and education ==
Amy Herr was born in Ohio, and grew up in Florida. In high school, a research project took her to the International Science and Engineering Fair, where she received an American Meteorological Society (AMS) Honorable Mention for her project focused on the performance of iced airfoils.

She earned her B.S. in Engineering & Applied Science at Caltech, and her M.S. and Ph.D. in Mechanical Engineering at Stanford University where she studied under Tom Kenny and Juan Santiago as a National Science Foundation Graduate Research Fellow. Her thesis is titled "Isoelectric Focusing for Multi-Dimensional Separations in Microfluidic Devices."

== Career and research ==
After completing her PhD, Herr became a staff member in the Biosystems Research Group at Sandia National Laboratories in Livermore, California from 2002 to 2007, where she worked on protein analysis in complex biological media such as saliva and serum. She joined the faculty at the University of California, Berkeley in 2007. Her laboratory focuses on developing the tools required for complex biological analysis, including identification of proteins from a single cell, in the pursuit of quantitative medicine. This proteomic information provides additional insights beyond genomic analysis. One application is analysis of proteins from circulating tumor cells, which could allow a doctor to understand how a cancer patient is responding to treatment with only a blood draw. The lab is also affiliated with University of California, San Francisco, QB3: The California Institute of Quantitative Biosciences, and the Lawrence Berkeley National Laboratory. She describes her research interests in this way:

"Difficult measurement challenges exist at the interface of biology and quantitative science. Advanced measurement tools are already adding to our knowledge and capabilities in the areas of genomics and transcriptomics. As we push forward the frontier of quantitative, precise, and dynamic measurements, we’ll see even more knowledge unlocked from nature and translated into improving the human condition. Dynamic protein measurements are a lynchpin to realizing these knowledge leaps."

She held a five-year appointment as the Lester John and Lynne Dewar Lloyd Distinguished Professor of Bioengineering from 2015 to 2020. She is also on the advisory board for the Bakar Fellows program at UC Berkeley and previously served as its faculty director. She serves on the NIH National Advisory Council of Biomedical Imaging and Bioengineering and she is a board member of the Chemical and Biological Microsystems Society.

Herr is also an entrepreneur, co-founding Zephyrus Biosciences in 2013 (acquired by Bio-Techne, Inc. in 2016). Zephyrus Biosciences enabled protein analysis at the single cell level for thousands of cells in parallel. For this and her other efforts in commercializing academic research, she received the Berkeley Visionary Award from the City of Berkeley Chamber of Commerce, 2017. Speaking about the UC Berkeley campus entrepreneurial spirit, she said "When I came here, I never saw myself as an entrepreneur, but we have people here who can demystify the process. And if a student thinks, 'I can do this,' then it's going to spread to a lot of our students." The co-founders of Eko Devices, who developed a digital stethoscope and other cardiovascular health tools, credit their time in Herr's Capstone Design class with inspiring the initial idea for their company.

She also has a record of mentorship since her early career, including receiving an Outstanding Mentor Award in 2007 at Sandia Laboratories, the 2012 Ellen Weaver Award for mentoring from the Association of Women in Science (Northern California), and an Award for Excellence in Postdoctoral Mentoring from the Visiting Scientist & Postdoc. Affairs at UC Berkeley in 2019.

In 2020 during the COVID-19 pandemic, she joined N95DECON, a scientific consortium researching methods to effectively decontaminate N95 masks.

== Awards and honors ==
- SCIEX Microscale Separations, Innovations Medal, 2018
- Chan Zuckerberg (CZ) Biohub Investigator, 2017
- Berkeley Visionary Award from the City of Berkeley Chamber of Commerce
- Lester John & Lynne Dewer Lloyd Distinguished Professor, 2015-2020
- Elected Fellow, National Academy of Inventors, 2016
- Mid-Career Achievement Award from the AES Electrophoresis Society, 2016
- The Analytical Scientist Power List, 2016
- Elected Fellow, American Institute for Medical and Biological Engineering, 2015
- NSF CAREER Award, 2011
- NIH New Innovator Award, 2010
- Alfred P. Sloan Research Fellowship in Chemistry, 2010
- DARPA Young Faculty Award, 2009
