= Third Rock Ventures =

Venture capital firm

- Industry: Venture capital
- Founded: 2007
- Headquarters: 201 Brookline Ave, Boston, Massachusetts, United States
- Key people: Mark J. Levin; Kevin P. Starr; Robert I. Tepper
- Website: thirdrockventures.com

Third Rock Ventures is a venture capital firm with offices in Boston and San Francisco. Founded in 2007, the firm invests in biotechnology startups.

== Funding and investments ==
Third Rock Ventures has raised $3.8 billion since it was created and invested in more than 60 companies, including Sage Therapeutics, Editas Medicine, Constellation Pharmaceuticals and Flare Therapeutics.
