= Nucleic acid templated chemistry =

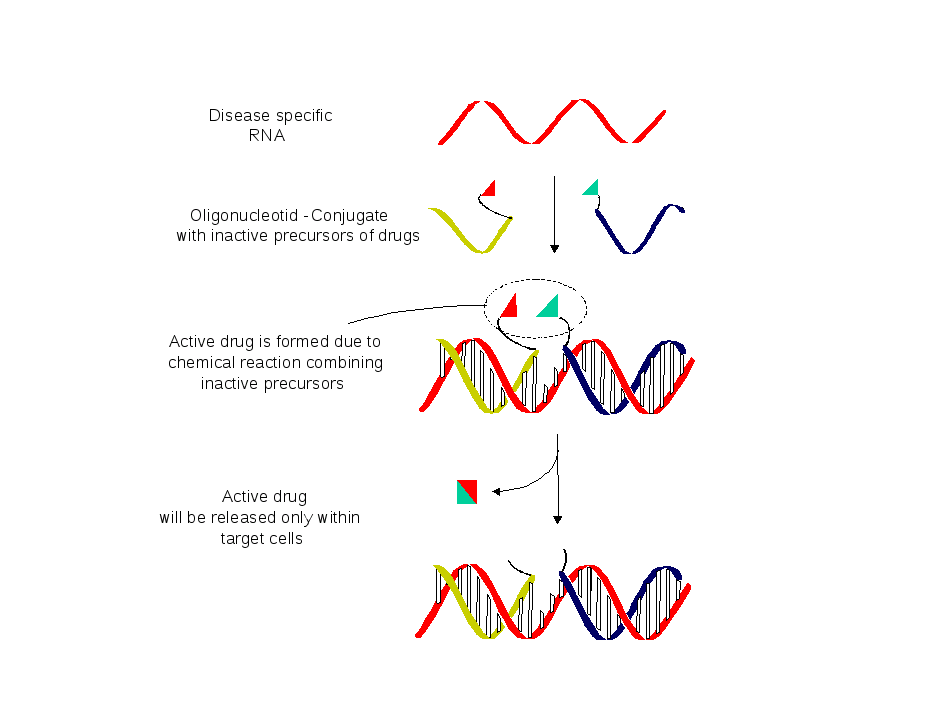
The schematic presentation how the nucleic acid templated chemistry works within cells

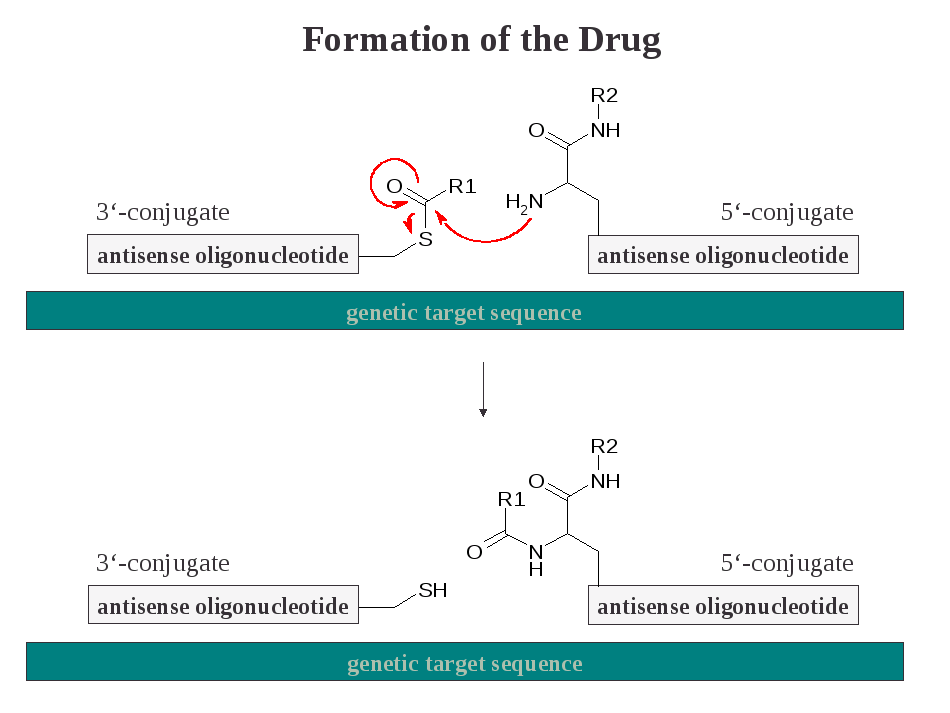
Schematic presentation of chemical reaction within cells to combine two precursors into an active drug

Nucleic acid templated chemistry (NATC), or DNA-templated chemistry, is a tool used in the controlled synthesis of chemical compounds. The main advantage of NAT-chemistry (NATC) is that it allows the user to perform the chemical reaction as an intramolecular reaction. Two oligonucleotides, or their analogues, are linked via chemical groups to precursors of chemical compounds. The oligonucleotides recognize specific nucleic acids and are hybridized sterically close to each other. Afterwards, the chemical active groups interact with each other to combine the precursors into a completely new chemical compound. NATC is usually used to perform synthesis of complex compounds without the need to protect chemically active groups during the synthesis.

In 1999 Pavel Sergeev suggested the use of NATC to synthesize biologically active compounds within living organisms., including use within human cells. In this application, the precursors are distributed in the whole human body and the chemical reactions are performed only within cells having specific RNA molecules. This approach allows very specific synthesis within particular tissues or within specific cells of the tissue. It is especially a new tool to deliver medications to cancer cells. Additionally biologically active compounds could be delivered to specific cells within humans to promote the targeted cells to divisions. NATC also opens the possibility to treat bacterial diseases. Many scientific groups have performed NATC in vivo to visualize eukaryotic as well as bacterial cells. As a principle, it may be employed to treat oncological and bacterial diseases, as well as to visualize them.

== See also ==
- DNA-encoded chemical library
