= Intrabody (protein) =

Human antibody

In molecular biology, an intrabody (from intracellular and antibody) is an antibody that works within the cell to bind to an intracellular protein. Due to the lack of a reliable mechanism for bringing antibodies into a living cell from the extracellular environment, this typically requires the expression of the antibody within the target cell, which can be accomplished in transgenic animals or by gene therapy. As a result, intrabodies are defined as antibodies that have been modified for intracellular localization, and the term has rapidly come to be used even when antibodies are produced in prokaryotes or other non-target cells. This term can apply to several types of protein targeting: the antibody may remain in the cytoplasm, or it may have a nuclear localization signal, or it may undergo cotranslational translocation across the membrane into the lumen of the endoplasmic reticulum, provided that it is retained in that compartment through a KDEL sequence.

Because naturally occurring antibodies are optimised to be secreted from the cell, cytosolic intrabodies require special alterations, including the use of single-chain antibodies (scFvs), modification of immunoglobulin VL domains for hyperstability, selection of antibodies resistant to the more reducing cytosolic environment, or expression as a fusion protein with maltose binding protein or other stable intracellular proteins. Such optimizations have improved the stability and structure of intrabodies, allowing the publication of a variety of promising applications against hepatitis B, avian influenza, prion diseases, inflammation, Parkinson's disease, and Huntington's disease. Optimizations required for cytosolic intrabodies are not needed for ER retained intrabodies, which fold in the compartment in which antibodies are naturally produced. Since the 1990s ER intrabodies have been used in various research areas to knock down membrane proteins and secreted proteins.
