= Danimer Scientific =

American biopolymer manufacturer

- Company type: Public
- Traded as: OTCQX: DNMR
- Industry: Biotechnology and bioplastics
- Founded: Bainbridge, Georgia, US (2004)
- Headquarters: Bainbridge, Georgia, U.S.
- Key people: Stephen Croskrey(CEO); Dr. Isao Noda (Board of Directors); Mike Hajost (CFO); Michael Smith (COO); Phil Van Trump (CTO); Scott Tuten (CMSO)
- Website: www.danimerscientific.com

Danimer Scientific, formerly known as Meredian Holdings Group Inc. and MHG, is a biopolymer manufacturer headquartered in Bainbridge, Georgia.

Danimer Scientific owns the patent for Nodax medium-chain-length branched polyhydroxyalkanoates, mcl-PHA. The company uses PHA and other biopolymers to create a range of applications such as additives, aqueous coatings, extrusion coating, extrusion lamination, fibers, film resins, hot melt adhesives, injection molding, thermoforming and wax replacement polymers. In addition, Danimer Scientific offers research and development in the formulation of biopolymers. Danimer Scientific also provides toll manufacturing and compounding services, allowing partners to use the Bainbridge facility to manufacture products.

== History ==
=== Danimer Scientific ===
Danimer Scientific was founded in 2004 to create biodegradable and sustainable solutions to the global dependency on traditional plastics, by using biopolymer materials such as polylactic acid (PLA). Danimer Scientific specializes in customizing biopolymer formulations.

In 2006, the Small Business Innovation Research (SBIR) program awarded Danimer with a Phase 1 monetary grant of $80,000 for the "Creation of Cost Competitive Biodegradable Films from Renewable Resources for Agriculture". The following year the SBIR awarded the company with a Phase 2 monetary grant of $346,000 for the same title, stating that the project's objective was to use renewable materials to develop agricultural mulch films that could adequately degrade before the next growing season

The company received the Sustainability Award from the Specialty Coffee Association of America (SCAA) in 2007 for the Ecotainer coffee cup, which used a plastic biopolymer derived from corn for the inner lining.

In 2010, Danimer Scientific received a contract for $846,828 from the organization, Research Partnership to Secure Energy for America (RPSEA) to develop an environmentally friendly fracturing treatment for hydrocarbon production, now known as SqueezeFrac.

In September 2011, Danimer Scientific and minority business enterprise, Sijo Global Partners, formed a strategic affiliation where Sijo would offer Danimer’s bioplastic products to market leaders and brand owners.

In January 2013, Danimer and Henkel formed a partnership to further develop bio-based hot melt adhesives for polyethylene terephthalate (PET) container packaging that are made with 50% renewable content or higher.

=== Meredian Inc. ===
Originally formed in 2004, Meredian Inc. manufactured PHA for Danimer Scientific.

Danimer and Meredian purchased Procter & Gamble’s intellectual property on PHA technology in 2007.

In February 2014, Danimer Scientific and Meredian Inc. merged into MHG. In March 2014, the company received a Food and Substance Contact Notification approval from the United States Food and Drug Association (FDA). The sole-verification guarantees that the biopolymers are safe to use for food contact and are classified as non-hazardous waste after disposal.

Stephen Croskrey was announced as chief executive officer of MHG in May 2016. The company's name changed to Danimer Scientific was officially announced in October 2016.

In March 2025, Danimer Scientific filed for Chapter 11 bankruptcy protection after a series of layoffs. In June 2025, Teknor Apex acquired Danimer Scientific for $19 million.

== PHA Patents ==
Danimer Scientific's PHA has received several certifications for biodegradability including: anaerobic and aerobic digestion in soil, freshwater, marine, industrial and home composting. The patented version of Danimer Scientific's mcl-PHA is known as Nodax and is the primary product developed for commercial manufacturing. Danimer Scientific's Nodax PHA is a class of bioplastics produced from bacterial microorganisms that store PHA polyesters for energy in their cell walls. These microbes feed upon plant-based oils procured from non-food sources. Plant based oils are transferred to Danimer Scientific’s proprietary bio-reactors and fed to naturally regenerating, soil-borne bacteria who produce PHA through biosynthesis. The reactive extrusion process mixes and compounds the bioplastic materials in a unique proprietary procedure that creates a customized biopolymer resin pellet.

== Affiliations ==
- Henkel
- SOLO/DART

== Certifications ==
- Meredian received sole-verification from the FDA for food substance contact
