= James Mullin =

Irish doctor & nationalist (1846–1920)

James Mullin JP
- Born: 1846; Cookstown, County Tyrone, Ireland
- Died: 19 December 1919 (aged 72–73); Cardiff, Wales
- Education: Queen's College, Galway
- Occupations: Physician, journalist and activist
- Organization: Irish Republican Brotherhood
- Political party: United Irish League

James Mullin (1846–1920) was born in Cookstown, County Tyrone. He left school at the age of eleven and worked on a farm, after which he spent nine years as a carpenter. He was one of the first recruits of the Fenian Brotherhood which he joined in 1865.

Aged 23, he secured an admission to Cookstown Academy, and through working part-time earned a scholarship to Queen's College Galway in 1871. He earned a Bachelor of Arts degree and a Doctor of Medicine degree at Queen's College, Galway; tutoring students and working as a journalist for local papers while pursuing the latter. After graduating in 1880, he emigrated to Britain and became an assistant to doctors in Brynmawr and Blaenavon while studying surgery and midwifery. Mullin achieved a Master of Surgery and a Master of Arts by 1881. He later practised as a locum in London and Cardiff, before establishing his own surgery practice in Cardiff. He also became chairman of the Cardiff branch of the United Irish League. Mullin joined the Irish Republican Brotherhood in 1865, inspired by reading Tom Paine and his mother's influence; he was a local activist and occasional contributor to the Irish People.

Mullin became involved in Irish politics in Cardiff through resentment at anti-Irish prejudice which he encountered in Britain. He disliked Charles Stewart Parnell, finding him snobbish and mendacious, and sided with the anti-parnellites during the split in the Irish Parliamentary Party. Though in later life he acquired a higher opinion of Parnell. Mullin revered Michael Davitt and considered his premature death a disaster for Ireland.

In 1895 he became a Justice of the Peace. He viewed the Irish literary revival as inferior to Young Ireland. In 1899 he clashed with the Gaelic League, denouncing the revival of Irish on utilitarian grounds, and his meeting with Patrick Pearse at the 1899 Eisteddfod displayed mutual incomprehension. Around 1906, Mullin was deposed from his Cardiff chairmanship as the result of political rivalry with a local priest, although he remained politically active through nationalist branches in Newport and Merthyr. Following the Easter Rising, Mullin was opposed to Sinn Féin and considered it inferior to the Fenians.

Mullin sold his practice in 1906 after developing diabetes which was exacerbated by decades of overworking. He travelled widely in retirement, working as a ship's doctor, writing articles on his travels for newspapers, and publishing a travel book, A scamper sunwards: from the land of Jones to the land of Judah. Mullin's travels came to an end in 1914 with the outbreak of the World War I. He supported the allied war effort by raising money for troops by selling copies of the ‘Spirit of Cambria’. On 19 December 1919, Mullin died in Cardiff.

A journalist later in life, Mullin spent his final years writing an autobiography, The Story of a Toiler's Life, which was published posthumously in 1921 and reprinted in 2000 as part of University College Dublin's Classics of Irish History series. The autobiography gives an account of plebeian life in mid-Victorian Ulster.

== Quote ==
Although he was a Catholic, he attended a Protestant school. Of this experience he was quoted as saying:

The intermingling of the sects was attended by the happiest results, inasmuch as it allowed the young people to understand one another and contract friendships which no subsequent surroundings or whispers of bigotry could ever wholly efface.
