= Jeannette zu Fürstenberg =

German businesswoman and entrepreneur

- Education: ESCP Business School, Free University of Berlin
- Occupations: Businesswoman, entrepreneur, venture capitalist, author
- Organization(s): La Famiglia VC, General Catalyst
- Spouse: Christian Prinz zu Fürstenberg
- Website: https://haus-fuerstenberg.com/

Jeannette Catherine Fürstin zu Fürstenberg (born September 10, 1982 in Duisburg as Jeannette Catherine Griesel) is a German businesswoman and entrepreneur. She is President and Managing Director of the global investment company General Catalyst, following the 2023 merger of La Famiglia, which she co-founded. Her work focuses on global venture capital investment, company creation, ecosystem development, artificial intelligence, industrial innovation, and public-private collaboration. In 2025, Manager Magazin calls her "the most powerful woman startup investor in Europe". Le Monde writes that she is one of the most influential figures of the European tech scene.

== Early life and education ==
Fürstenberg was born the daughter of Ghislaine Elsbeth Cecile Rademacher-Dubbick and her husband Peer Griesel. Her maternal family owns the measuring technology company Krohne Messtechnik (a German SME, or Mittelstand, which is recognized as a "hidden champion").

Fürstenberg studied communications and economics at LMU Munich. She studied economics at the ESCP Business School in Paris, graduating with a master's degree. She completed a PhD in Philosophy and Entrepreneurship at the Free University of Berlin. Her dissertation Die Wechselwirkung zwischen unternehmerischer Innovation und Kunst: Eine wissenschaftliche Untersuchung in der Renaissance und am Beispiel der Medici discusses the dynamic between entrepreneurship and artistic innovation in the Renaissance.

== Entrepreneurship ==
Following her studies, she has worked for Ernst & Young, Synthesis, and AXA.

=== La Famiglia ===
Fürstenberg has been active in the start-up ecosystem as co-founder, investor and advisor since 2013.

In 2016, she co-founded La Famiglia VC, a European-based venture capital fund investing in early stage tech companies across Europe and the US. Her co-founder was Robert Lacher. Later she ran the firm together with Judith Dada.

Coming from an industrial background herself, she designed La Famiglia as a bridge between the world of startup founders and established Mittelstand companies.

In 2021, zu Fürstenberg sought to invest in defense startup Helsing, but European regulations prevented La Famiglia from investing in military-affiliated companies, so she instead invested personally. In 2023, La Famiglia participated in Helsing's Series B funding, with zu Fürstenberg again investing personally.

La Famiglia merged with American VC firm General Catalyst in 2023, after which zu Fürstenberg became a managing director at the latter, overseeing its European business.

=== General Catalyst ===
Zu Fürstenberg and her firm General Catalyst lead the EU's AI Champions initiative. The initiative brings together 120 European companies across Europe, aiming to make Europe a global AI leader through coordinating efforts across industry, technology, capital and policy. This group of companies, led by General Catalyst, consists of startups such as Black Forest Labs, Mistral AI, Mirakl and Personio, and incumbents such as Deutsche Bank, L'Oréal, Mercedes-Benz, Porsche, SAP, Volkswagen Group, Siemens and Spotify.

On the initiative's official website, the mission statement written by her reads:

The initiative aims to frame a positive vision for Europe by mobilizing talent and capital, accelerating AI adoption in established industries, and increasing European companies’ competitiveness. Led by General Catalyst, our mission is to foster a resilient partnership between incumbents and technology providers to unlock Europe's full potential in AI. Europe can seize a generational opportunity by leading in applied AI, integrating it into Europe's industrial base to boost productivity, resilience, and economic sovereignty, especially in key sectors like manufacturing, energy, and defense.

To support this vision, General Catalyst's report ‘An Ambitious Agenda for European AI’ provides a strategic blueprint for Europe's path to AI leadership.

In a paper named "Capital ecosystem of European AI: Patriotic billionaires, development banks, and the evolution of state-finance nexus", Leevi Saari writes that General Catalyst "is a central node in the European funding ecosystem", with stakes in elite companies such as Helsing, Black Forest Labs and Mistral. Saari states that while General Catalyst is nominally a Silicon Valley company, "their European operations are a result of a merger with a German VC fund La Famiglia in 2023" and that "These European operations are led by the former co-founder of La Famiglia, German hereditary princess Jeannette zu Fürstenberg".

In 2025, in an interview with Frankfurter Allgemeine Zeitung, Fürstenberg said that in the area of artificial intelligence, Germany and Europe should not just think about making progress, but actually winning the global race. She called for Germans and Europeans not to be intimidated by American and Chinese megaprojects such as the $500 billion Stargate project. She explained that in the first wave of internet technology development, European had not been able to catch up due to the fragmented markets in Europe, but AI would open new possibilities.

=== Board positions ===
Zu Fürstenberg sits on the board of German defense unicorn Helsing, Swedish AI legal tech unicorn Legora, and French LLM unicorn Mistral AI.

She joined the board of satellite startup Iceye in December 2025 after General Catalyst led a 200 million euros funding round for the company. In November 2026, she no longer served in company's board.

== Cultural and political work ==
=== Fürstenberg Zeitgenössisch ===
In 2011, zu Fürstenberg and her husband founded Fürstenberg Zeitgenössisch. The project consists of a fellowship programme, exhibitions and the establishment of a small collection. The focus is on young, emerging artists who have distinguished themselves in recent years through new concepts and languages of form and have in this context become the focus of international discourse. The fellowship supports three artists annually followed by exhibitions. Artists who have been supported include Kai Althoff, Petrit Halilaj and Trisha Baga. The temporary exhibitions also regularly feature established artists. The works of Kris Martin; Gregor Schneider and Victor Man have been featured.

Art historian Moritz Wesseler served as the artistic director until 2013. He worked as a curator and continued to involve himself with the scholarship until 2018 when he became the director of the Fridericianum in Kassel.

In 2017 when Victor Man agreed to have his works exhibited, the Südkurier notes that while the artist rarely exhibits, zu Fürstenberg, who considers him a favorite artist, and Wesseler succeeded in getting him to show his works and produce new pieces specifically for the exhibition.

=== Political activities ===
In the lead-up to the 2025 German federal election, the Manager Magazin reported that zu Fürstenberg and other prominent entrepreneurs such as Christian Miele, Helsing CEO Gundbert Scherf, Ludwig Ensthaler (previously at Rocket Internet) and Alexander Kudlich (co-founder of 468 Capital) focused on expanding their influence among CDU campaigners. One of their successes was pushing through the establishment of the Digital Ministry.

Zu Fürstenberg is a member of the Rhine Group, a forum chaired by former ECB President Mario Draghi and Stripe CEO Patrick Collison and aiming at helping "translate the recommendations contained in Draghi's 2024 report, The Future of European Competitiveness (aka the Draghi report), into reforms."

Zu Fürstenberg is known as a core member of the Munich Security Conference (MSC)'s Tech Strategy Initiative (TSI). She is also a member of the IfW Kiel's Board of Trustees. On March 2025, the Kiel Institute published the Sparta Paper ("Strategic Protection and Advanced Resilience Technology Alliance", followed by the Sparta 2.0 paper on May 2026, both of which she was a co-author) which presents a strategic framework to achieve European defense technology autonomy and significantly reduce dependence on the U.S within a time frame of 10 years.

She was a participant in the 2026 Bilderberg Conference.

== Reputation and awards ==
Zu Fürstenberg is known to have strong networking skills but also able to sever connections for the sake of her plans. According to Manager Magazin, she builds connections between established business families and young startup teams, maintains relationships with high profile investors both in Silicon Valley and Europe, and is known to have contacts in the German Federal Chanceller and the Élysée Palace.

In a paper named "Neue Waffen, neues Geld? 'Defence-Startups' in der BRD" published by the Informationsstelle Militarisierung (a peace-advocating association), Franz Enders mentions the role of zu Fürstenberg as an advocator for New Defence and states that the push for innovation might also come with the concerning trend of "fusion of the high-tech industry, the war economy, and venture capital".

Writing for Informationsstelle Militarisierung, Andreas Seifert states that zu Fürstenberg and the advisory group that she leads (through their paper "Der Weg zu europäischer Verteidigungsautonomie: Ein Leitfaden zur Überwindung kritischer Abhängigkeiten", published by the Kiel Institute) ignore naval armament, except autonomous underwater vehicles, thus overlooking the global ambitions of the navy.

=== Awards ===
- Zu Fürstenberg is named "Woman investor of the year 2022" by Handelsblatt.
- Zu Fürstenberg has been named the "Woman of the Hour" and honored as the Prima inter Pares of the Year 2025 by Manager Magazin and the Boston Consulting Group's "100 Most Influential Women in German Business" initiative.
- 2026: Appointed Chevalier de l'Ordre national du Merie (Knight of the French National Order of Merit) for her contributions to European AI innovation and Franco-German cooperation
- 2026: Number 71 on Forbes "The Midas List: Global Top Tech Investors"
- 2025: Number 8 on the Forbes list ″The Midas List Europe: Top Tech Investors″

== Publications ==
- Die Wechselwirkung zwischen unternehmerischer Innovation und Kunst, 2012 (German), Springer-Verlag ISBN 978-3-8349-4508-2
- Europe's New Renaissance: How the "Old Continent" is Reinventing Itself, with Inge Kloepfer, 2025, ISBN 978-3-492-07499-5 (the German version, Wie gut wir sind, zeigt sich in Krisenzeiten, published by Piper Verlag ISBN 978-3-492-07321-9, was awarded the German Business Book of the Year by a jury consisting of Handelsblatt and Frankfurt Book Fair)

== Personal life ==
On 16 September 2010 she married Christian Prinz zu Fürstenberg (b. 1977) in a civil ceremony in Donaueschingen.

She began playing polo in 2010, and co-founded the Fürstenberg Polo Club with her husband later that year. She speaks five languages. She is influenced in both artistic taste and business thinking by her grandfather, the entrepreneur and painter Kristian Rademacher-Dubbick, who gave up his artistic career to take over the family business after the Second World War.

In 2026, zu Fürstenberg said that, she always feels like she never belongs to one circle, which happened when she moved from her family's industrial business world to the academia, when she married into a 800-year-old royal family, and when she works in the Silicon Valley.

She tells Frankfurter Allgemeine Zeitung that among painters, her favorites are Albrecht Dürer, Rembrandt, Anselm Kiefer, Pablo Picasso and Victor Man. Among composers, she likes Bach the most, with her other favorites being Beethoven, Schubert, Shostakovich and Mozart.
