= Emil Radev =

Bulgarian politician

Emil Radev MEP
- Емил Радев
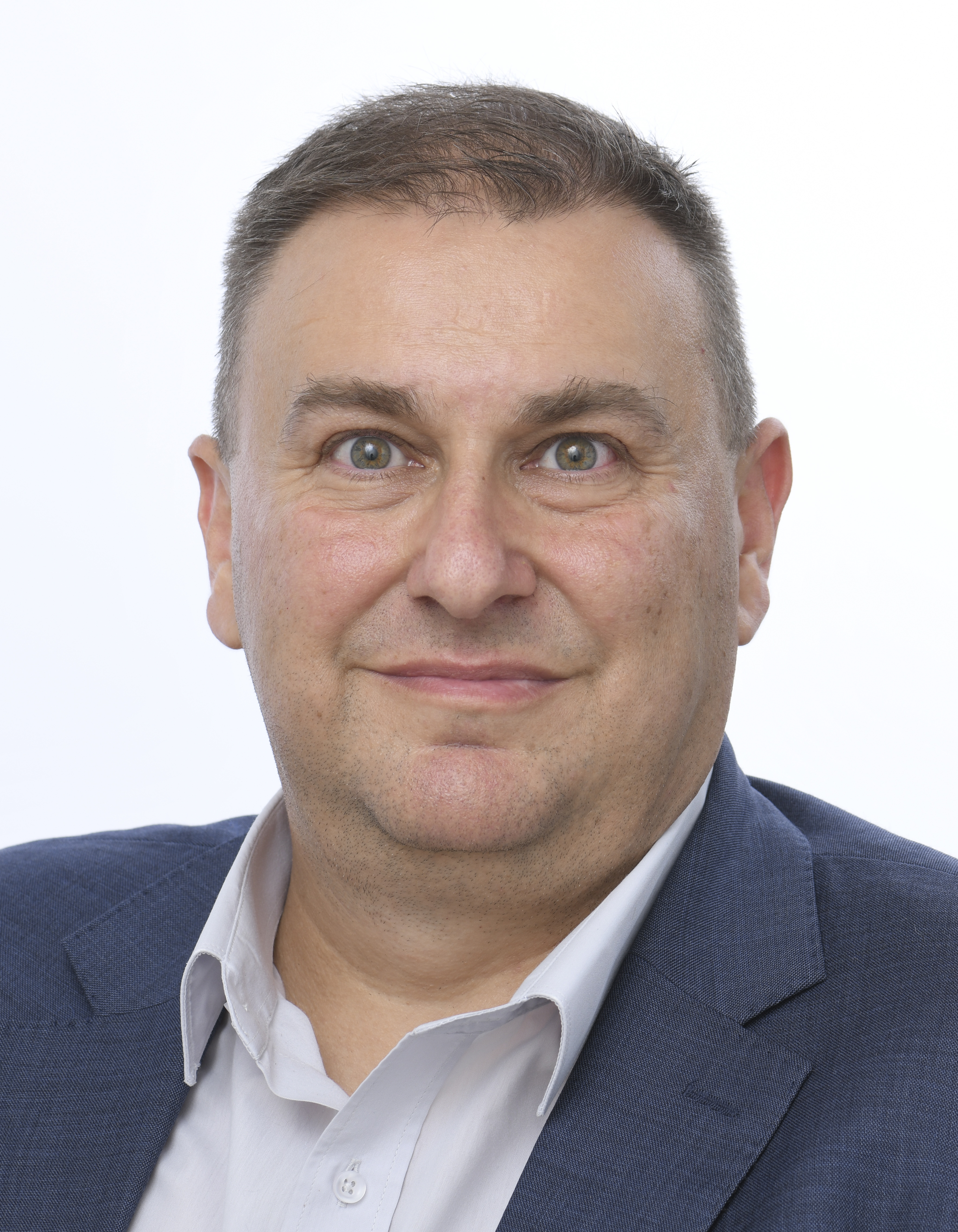

Member of the European Parliament for Bulgaria

Personal details
- Born: 26 May 1971 (age 55) Varna, Bulgaria
- Party: Citizens for European Development of Bulgaria

Emil Yordanov Radev (Bulgarian: Емил Йорданов Радев, born 26 May 1971) is a Bulgarian politician currently serving as a Member of the European Parliament for the Citizens for European Development of Bulgaria.

== Political positions ==
In 2025, Radev proposed together with Axel Voss and Angelika Niebler the deletion of safeguards to protect workers rights in the EU proposal for a new legal framework for start-ups, known as the 28th regime.
