= Axel Voss =

German lawyer and politician (born 1963)

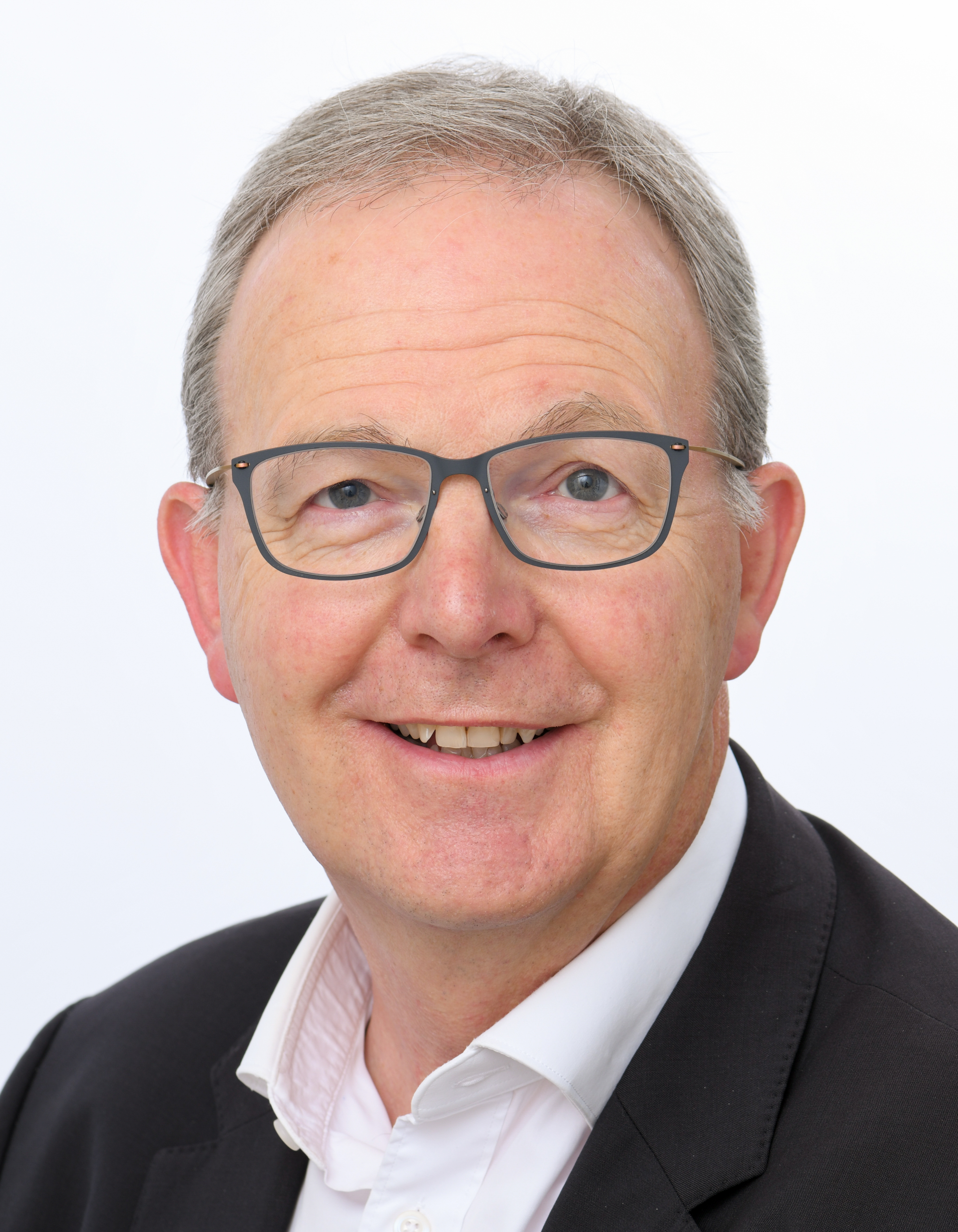

Member of the European Parliament
- Incumbent
- Assumed office 1 July 2009
- Constituency: Germany
- Affiliation: EPP Group

Personal details
- Born: 7 April 1963 (age 63) Hamelin, Germany
- Party: (Germany) Christian Democratic Union (European Union) European People's Party
- Spouse: Sabine Voss
- Children: 2
- Education: University of Trier; LMU Munich; University of Freiburg
- Profession: Lawyer
- Website: axel-voss-europa.de

Axel Voss (born 7 April 1963, Hamelin) is a German lawyer and politician of the Christian Democratic Union of Germany who has been serving as a Member of the European Parliament since 2009 and became coordinator of the European People's Party group in the Committee on Legal Affairs in 2017. His parliamentary work focuses on digital and legal topics.

In addition to his parliamentary mandate, Voss has also been working as a lawyer with Bietmann, a law firm in Cologne, since 2021.

== Life, education and early career ==
Voss was born in Hamelin. He is Evangelical-Lutheran, married and has two daughters. From 1983 to 1990, he studied law at the University of Trier, LMU Munich, and the University of Freiburg, thereby specialized in European and international law, made a language stay in Paris and eventually passed the first Staatsexamen in 1990. After assisting the UN Department of Technical Cooperation for Development in New York and a traineeship at the Supreme Provincial Court of Appeal in Koblenz, he finished his second Staatsexamen in 1994 and started to work as a lawyer.

Later that year, Voss became the Citizens' adviser of the European Commission at the regional Commission Representation in Bonn. From 2000 to 2008, he taught European affairs at the RheinAhrCampus in Remagen of the University of Applied Sciences in Koblenz.

== Political career ==
Voss joined the German CDU in 1996 and chaired the Bonn affiliation from 2004 to 2009. Since 2011 he has been the district chair of the CDU in the Middle Rhine area. Voss has also been a Member of the European Parliament for this constituency (which includes Bonn, Cologne, Leverkusen, Rhein-Sieg- and Rhein-Erft-Kreis) since the 2009 European elections.

In his third parliamentary term from 2019 to 2024, he serves as member of the Committee on Legal Affairs (JURI), deputy member of the Committee on Civil Liberties, Justice and Home Affairs (LIBE), member of the Special Committee on Artificial Intelligence in a Digital Age (AIDA), deputy chairman of the delegation for Australia and New Zealand (DANZ) and substitute member of the delegation for South Asia (DSAS).

Voss has been the rapporteur or shadow rapporteur for the center-right European People's Party group (EPP) on the General Data Protection Regulation (GDPR), Passenger Name Record (PNR), Eurojust regulation, EU-US Privacy Shield, Digital Content Directive, reform of the EU copyright law, ePrivacy Regulation, the European Parliament's legislative own-initiative report on a civil liability regime for Artificial Intelligence and the special report of the AIDA-committee.

In 2014, when Edward Snowden testified before the European Parliament, Voss inquired why Snowden had chosen to go public with his information, if he had considered the potential risks for the lives of innocents and for the global efforts against terrorism, and about possible connections to Russian intelligence agencies. However, Voss also stated that the clandestine access of third countries to European data is illegal. As rapporteur, Voss was an avid supporter of Article 13 of the European Directive on Copyright in the Digital Single Market, saying that "this directive is an important step towards correcting a situation which has allowed a few companies to earn huge sums of money without properly remunerating the thousands of creatives and journalists whose work they depend on."

Since the GDPR was adopted in 2016, Voss repeatedly criticized the vast number of derogations, the inconsistent interpretation of the law among member states and the missing exemptions for small and medium-sized enterprises, organizations, clubs and societies as well as private users. Considering 'consent' as the “death of privacy”, Voss strongly argues in favor of new technical approaches to simplify the processing of (personal) data, accelerate data sharing across Europe and to enable the full use of emerging technologies such as AI while protecting the personal data of citizens more effectively. Using similar arguments, he also rejects the proposal for a new ePrivacy regulation, especially since it would partially replace the GDPR provisions as lex specialis. Others, such as European Digital Rights, contradict his views and emphasis the massive improvements for the privacy of European citizens.

In early 2020, media reported on Voss' warning that Europe would become a "digital colony of the USA or China" if the member states could not agree on radical countermeasures and are not willing to expand the Digital Single Market massively. "Europe must pursue a third - a European - path of digitalization, which is based on our values in data protection and data sovereignty" Voss said at the DLD conference in Munich. He later published a 19-page digital manifesto with a series of concrete proposals to the European institutions in order to strengthen Europe's digital sovereignty and geopolitical competitiveness.

In 2025, Voss proposed together with Emil Radev and Angelika Niebler the deletion of safeguards to protect workers rights in the EU proposal for a new legal framework for start-ups, known as the 28th regime.

== Other activities ==
=== Corporate boards ===
- Deutsche Telekom, Member of the Data Privacy Advisory Board

=== Non-profit organizations ===
- Europa-Union Deutschland, Chairman of the Bonn/Rhein-Sieg Chapter
- Mérite Européen Friendship group Germany, Vice-president
- Senator of SME Europe, the official business association of the European People's Party
- Rotary International, Member
- European Logistics Platform, Member of the Advisory Board

== Recognition ==
In 2019, Voss was the recipient of the Digital Single Market Award at The Parliament Magazine's annual MEP Awards. Voss was also the recipient of the Digital Strategy and Single Marker Award at 2022 MEP Awards ceremony

Video statement (English)
