= Rhine Group =

European competitiveness policy group founded in 2026

- Formation: August 24, 2026; 2 months ago
- Founder: Mario Draghi; Patrick Collison
- Type: Think tank
- Legal status: Non-profit association under Swiss law
- Headquarters: Geneva, Switzerland
- Members: 59 (2026)
- Co-chairs: Mario Draghi; Patrick Collison
- Executive Director: Luis Garicano
- Staff: 5 (2026)
- Website: www.rhinegroup.eu

The Rhine Group is a European policy forum and think tank founded in August 2026 by the Italian economist Mario Draghi, a former president of the European Central Bank and prime minister of Italy, and the Irish entrepreneur Patrick Collison, co-founder and chief executive of Stripe. The two serve as co-chairs, while the Spanish economist and former MEP Luis Garicano is its executive director.

The group brings together roughly 55 economists, entrepreneurs, business executives, academics and former policymakers and describes its purpose as translating the analysis of Draghi's 2024 report The Future of European Competitiveness into reforms that European governments and institutions can implement. It is constituted as an association under the Swiss Civil Code with a registered office in Geneva and states that it is independent of the European institutions and non-partisan.

The launch attracted substantial coverage in the European press and also early criticism, chiefly over the limited representation of Central and Eastern Europe among its members and over the group's reliance on Swiss incorporation and United States technology providers despite its emphasis on European strategic autonomy.

== Background ==
In September 2024, at the request of the European Commission, Draghi published The Future of European Competitiveness, which argued that the European Union faced weak investment, lagging technology adoption and declining productivity relative to the United States, and set out proposals covering energy, industrial policy, defence, digital infrastructure, capital markets and education. The report became a central reference in EU economic debate, but its implementation was widely regarded as slow. Garicano, who worked with Draghi on the original report, said in interviews around the launch that the reform agenda had stalled and that the new group would seek to prioritise proposals and support their implementation.

== Formation ==
The Rhine Group was announced on 24 August 2026, with Garicano publicising the initiative on social media and its founding statement published on the group's website. The name refers to the Rhine, the river running through several of Europe's largest economies.

The group is led by Draghi and Collison as co-chairs and co-founders, with Garicano as executive director; Julia Garayo Willemyns is Chief Policy Officer, Teresa Raigada is Chief of Staff and Marta Garayoa is Chief Operating Officer. Its inaugural session is scheduled for 20-23 September 2026.

== Aims and working methods ==
The group's founding statement argues that only four of the fifty largest technology companies in the world are European and that the continent is weak across the emerging technologies expected to shape the coming decades. It links continued stagnation to a diminishing capacity to finance defence, public health care, pensions, education, climate investment and social protection and contends that the external environment has become less favourable through higher United States tariffs, stronger competition from China and more exposed strategic dependencies. The statement nonetheless maintains that "[d]ecline is not inevitable" and that Europe remains the world's second-largest market.

Discussions are based on commissioned research papers circulated in advance as pre-reads and are held under the Chatham House Rule. Members are expected to meet at least once a year, with further work developed by outside experts and the group has said it intends to publish a series of documents. Reporting at the time of the launch described the Aspen Economic Strategy Group in the United States, founded by Henry Paulson, Timothy Geithner and Ben Bernanke, as a model for the initiative.

== Membership ==
Membership was reported at 55 people at the launch, drawn from business, finance, academia, technology and public life. French and German members formed the largest national contingents with twelve each, followed by seven Italians, six Britons and five Spaniards.

Members include the Nobel laureates in economics Philippe Aghion and Bengt Holmström; the economists Lucrezia Reichlin, Francesco Giavazzi, Beatrice Weder di Mauro, Pierre-Olivier Gourinchas, John Van Reenen, Timothy Besley, Stefanie Stantcheva, Ulrike Malmendier and Andreu Mas-Colell; the former French finance minister Bruno Le Maire; the former Estonian president Toomas Hendrik Ilves; the Autorité de la concurrence president Benoît Cœuré; the physicist and former Dutch minister Robbert Dijkgraaf; and the editors Roula Khalaf of the Financial Times and Zanny Minton Beddoes of The Economist.

Business and technology members include Niklas Zennström of Atomico, Sebastian Siemiatkowski of Klarna, Tobias Lütke of Shopify, Xavier Niel of Iliad, Michael Miebach of Mastercard, Carlos Torres Vila of BBVA, Vittorio Colao, Andrea Pignataro of ION Group, Luca Ferrari of Bending Spoons, Torsten Reil of Helsing, Hélène Huby of The Exploration Company, Matt Clifford of the Advanced Research and Invention Agency, Jeannette zu Fürstenberg of General Catalyst and Luciana Lixandru of Sequoia Capital.

== Reception ==
The launch was reported across European media as a return by Draghi to the centre of the continent's economic debate and as an attempt to move the competitiveness discussion from diagnosis to implementation. Commentators noted that the group positions itself as a venue connecting research, policy and industry.

Several outlets criticised the composition of the membership. The only member from a country that joined the European Union in 2004 or later is Ilves, and Poland - one of the bloc's fastest-growing economies - has no representative; the Polish economist Marcin Piątkowski argued that Europe had overlooked the lessons of its own most successful economic transformation.

The conservative outlet Brussels Signal noted a tension between the group's emphasis on European technological sovereignty and its Swiss registered office and its website's reliance on the United States providers Webflow, Amazon Web Services and Fastly, as disclosed in its own legal notice, as well as the presence of members holding senior roles at US-based or US-linked firms. The same report questioned the inclusion of the investor Leopold Aschenbrenner, whose hedge fund had suffered heavy losses in July 2026 and among whose early backers was Collison; the fund was not accused of wrongdoing.

== See also ==
- Draghi report
- European Round Table for Industry
- Bruegel
- Chatham House Rule
- Economy of the European Union
