= Institute of Liberal Politics =

Armenia-based think tank

- Abbreviation: ILP
- Founded: 2017
- Type: Educational institute, think tank
- Purpose: Liberal democracy, non formal education, policy making, rule of law
- Headquarters: Yerevan
- Location: Armenia
- Origins: Bright Armenia
- Region served: Armenia; Artsakh
- President: Tatevik Matinyan
- Affiliations: European Liberal Forum
- Website: liberalinstitute.am

The Institute of Liberal Politics (ILP) (Armenian: Լիբերալ քաղաքականության ինստիտուտ, romanized: Liberal k’aghak’akanut’yan institut) is a non-governmental educational and research institute and an independent think tank in Armenia. The ILP was founded in 2017 and is headquartered in Yerevan.

== History ==
The Institute of Liberal Politics was founded on 27 September 2017 as an NGO by Bright Armenia, an Armenian political party. The opening ceremony was attended by Nikol Pashinyan, political scientist Ara Papian, and former EU Ambassador to Armenia Piotr Świtalski. The ILP is a full member of the European Liberal Forum. Tatevik Matinyan is the current President of the institute.

The ILP manages the School of Liberal Politics which offers an educational program focused on liberal politics. In 2018, Ambassador of the United States of America to Armenia Lynne M. Tracy met with students of the program. In 2019, former President of Armenia Armen Sarkissian and Chairman of Bright Armenia Edmon Marukyan attended a graduation ceremony for students of the program. As of 2023, 170 students have graduated from the program.

Partners of the ILP include the Friedrich Naumann Foundation, the National Democratic Institute, and VVD International.

== Objectives ==
The Institute of Liberal Politics aims at preparing a new generation of leaders who are willing to support and spread liberal values and become advocates for democratic consolidation through non-formal civic and political education throughout Armenia. The organization seeks to advance human rights, multilateralism, cultural exchange, inclusiveness, and the empowerment of society. The ILP also supports the European integration of Armenia and the development of closer Armenia–European Union relations. The ILP organizes education seminars, conducts research, participates in debates, and provides expert opinions on domestic and foreign issues.

== Activities ==
In October 2022, the Institute of Liberal Politics implemented the "Combating hate speech for the sake of pluralism and tolerant democratic society" project with the assistance of the Embassy of the Netherlands in Armenia.

On 21 January 2023, the ILP in collaboration with the Embassy of the Netherlands in Armenia organized a conference on combating hate speech, promoting political pluralism, and developing a more tolerant and democratic society. Representatives from the European Party of Armenia, Republic Party, Civil Contract, the Human Rights Defender of Armenia, and Union of Informed Citizens were invited to participate.

== See also ==
- Education in Armenia
- Liberalism in Armenia
- Politics in Armenia
