= Luis Garicano =

Spanish economist and politician

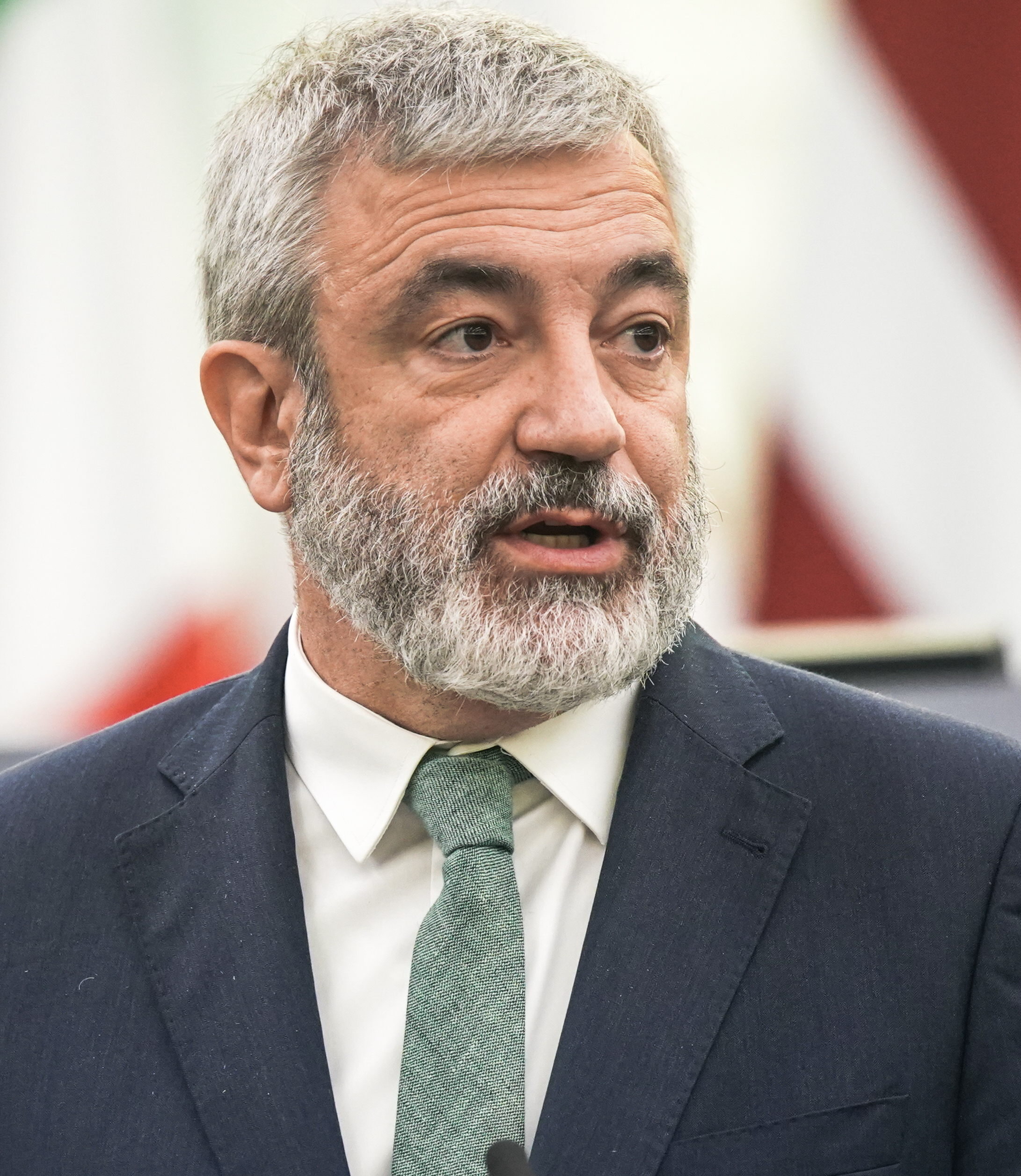
- Garicano in 2022

Member of the European Parliament for Spain
- In office 2 July 2019 – 1 September 2022

Personal details
- Born: 1967 (age 58–59) Valladolid, Spain
- Party: Citizens (2015–2022)
- Education: University of Valladolid (BA); College of Europe (MA); University of Chicago (MA, PhD)

Luis Garicano Gabilondo (pronounced [ˈlwis ɣaɾiˈkano]; born 1967) is a Spanish economist and politician who was a Member of the European Parliament (MEP) from 2019 to 2022. He was also vice president of Renew Europe and vice president of the European political party Alliance of Liberals and Democrats for Europe (ALDE Party). Before entering politics, he was a professor of strategy and economics at IE Business School in Madrid and at the London School of Economics (LSE). After leaving the European Parliament he has returned to academia as a visiting professor at Columbia Business School and at the University of Chicago Booth School of Business. In 2023, returned to LSE as full professor at the School of Public Policy.

In 2026, he became Executive Director of the Rhine Group, co-founded by Mario Draghi and Patrick Collison.

== Life and academic career ==
Luis Garicano was born in Valladolid. He is the son of Ana Gabilondo and Luis Garicano. His great uncle, Tomás Garicano Goñi, was a military lawyer, governor and politician, who served as Minister of Interior under the Franco dictatorship. He studied at the San José School, a Jesuit school, in his hometown.

Garicano obtained bachelor's degrees in economics (1990) and Law (1991) from the University of Valladolid. Subsequently, he obtained a master's degree in European economic studies from the College of Europe in Bruges (Belgium) in 1992 and a second master's degree in economics from the University of Chicago in 1995. He received his doctorate (PhD) in economics from the same institution three years later, in 1998. At the University of Chicago, his thesis supervisor was Sherwin Rosen, one of the leading labor economists of the 20th century. During his time there he was also the teaching assistant of Gary Becker and Kevin M. Murphy, two of the main exponents of the theory of human capital; the economic theory which argues for the quality and education of workers as the main factor in fostering economic growth.

After obtaining his doctorate he was hired as an assistant professor at the Booth School of Business, where he continued to study the economics of knowledge within labor markets. He would go on to become an associate professor in 2002 and a full professor (tenured) in 2006. During his stay in Chicago, he was also a visiting professor at the Sloan School of Management, the Pompeu Fabra University and the London Business School.

In 2007, he received the Banco Herrero Foundation Award to the best Spanish economist under 40 years of age. In 2008 he transferred to the London School of Economics and Political Science (LSE) as a professor (chair) of economics and strategy and as the director of research as a part of the founding team of the new management department. In November 2008, at the inauguration of the new building of this department, after giving a presentation on the financial crisis Queen Elizabeth II asked Garicano what would become an infamous question: Why did nobody see the crisis coming?

At LSE he also founded and directed the master's program in economics and management and, in 2011, became the group head of the Managerial Economics and Strategy Group.

In May 2017 he joined the Business School of IE University as professor of economics and strategy. There he is also the director of the Center for the Digital Economy, which supports the development of the academic fields of economics, business, sociology and law. Additionally, he is a researcher at the Center for Economic Policy Research and is affiliated with the Center for Economic Performance.

Garicano has worked as an economist for the European Commission (between 1992 and 1993), for the consulting firm McKinsey & Company (1998) and for the Foundation for Applied Economics Studies (2010), where he held the McKinsey Chair. Between January 2012 and April 2016, he was also an independent member of the board of directors of Liberbank.

In line with his influences at the University of Chicago, his research focuses on productivity, technological innovation and the organization of work; also focusing on inequality, economic growth and banking systems. His first academic article (2000) "Hierarchies and the organization of knowledge in production", argues that hierarchies within companies are tools to manage knowledge and promote specialization.

In another article with Esteban Rossi Hansberg (2006), "Organization and inequality in the knowledge economy", they explore this theory of the firm further to see how information and communication technologies might differently affect business organization and inequality: while information technologies decentralize and increase the returns to knowledge throughout the distribution, communication technologies centralize and, consequently, have the opposite effect. This theory was successfully tested in his 2014 article with Nick Bloom, Raffaella Sadun, and John Van Reenen: "The distinct effects of information technology and communication technology in the organization of the company".

This vision of organizations goes further than other theories (such as that of firms as aligning incentives) and has been recognized, Garicano having published in the main economic journals, including the Quarterly Journal of Economics, the Journal of Political Economy, The Review of Economic Studies, the American Economic Review and the Journal of Economic Perspectives.

== Activism ==
For years, Luis Garicano has actively promoted structural reforms to Spanish institutions and the economy, especially in the labor market and the health and pension systems. His activism is often compared the activist regenerationism of José Ortega y Gasset. In this line, he is a frequent contributor of opinion and analysis to main news outlets, including the Financial Times, El País and El Mundo.

In 2009 he founded the blog Nada Es Gratis to promote a more sophisticated public discourse grounded on evidence and economic methods, and the blog has grown to become the main economics blog in Spanish. Two years later, and together with 5 other experts, Garicano published his first book (under the same name as the blog) in which they argued for reforms to the Spanish economy to ensure productivity and promote growth.

In 2012 he was part of a commission of 11 experts to reform the Spanish university system. In 2013 he published a manifesto in conjunction with Carles Casajuana, César Molinas and Elisa de la Nuez advocating for a reform to political party regulation, which ended up being supported by around a hundred Spanish intellectuals.

In 2014 he published his first solo book, El dilema de España (Spain's dilemma), in which he argues Spain must choose between becoming the Denmark or the Venezuela of southern Europe. Specifically, the book proposes educational and institutional reforms to encourage meaningful growth and avoid the perverse incentives that caused the 2008 financial crisis.

Taking part in groups such as Euro-Economics and the Council for the European Crisis of the Institute for New Economic Thinking (INET), Garicano has also been one of the leading economists advocating structural reforms to the European financial system. He was a member of the group of economists led by Markus Brunnermeier that developed the European Safe Bonds (ESBies) proposal for the creation of securities backed by a diversified portfolio of euro area central government bonds. This innovative financial instrument was proposed as a solution to help banks diversify their sovereign exposures and further weaken the link between them and their home governments. The proposal was taken up by the European Commission under the name SBBS in 2018.

== Politics ==
On 8 February 2015, he announced his entry into politics by joining Ciudadanos – Partido de la Ciudadanía (Citizens – Party of the Citizenry), a Spanish center-right liberal party. Since then he has been the party's chief economist. He was in charge of drafting the party's economic program ahead of the 2015 and 2016 general elections and has been the main architect behind Ciudadanos' main economic proposals, including a Spanish equivalent of the American earned income tax credit and the "single contract" (a proposal to abolish structural inequalities within the labor market). After being the Head of Economy, Knowledge and Industry, since 2017 he has been the Head of Economy and Employment.

His work on Ciudadanos' program is summarized in his book Recuperar el Futuro (Reclaiming the Future), with Toni Roldán (the then spokesman for the economy of Ciudadanos and an academic disciple of Garicano at the London School of Economics).

Garicano has also been one of the central advocates of liberalism within the party; and was a key factor in the party's ideological transition in 2017 from social democracy towards progressive liberalism. On 2 December 2016, in Poland, he was appointed vice-president of the centrist Alliance of Liberals and Democrats for Europe Party.

Led by Margrethe Vestager, Garicano was among the seven-strong "Team Europe" that ALDE picked to spearhead its pro-EU, liberal campaign ahead of the 2019 European elections.

During his time as a Member of the European Parliament, Garicano made proposals on the completion of the banking union and on the EU's carbon border adjustment mechanism. At the same time, during the pandemic he was influential in shaping the EU's economic response to the crisis, as his proposals for a European temporary employment protection scheme, and a recovery fund financed through the EU budget with new Own Resources, were later adopted by the EU (as SURE and NextGen EU); in this manner, he was one of the negotiators of the Recovery and Resilience Facility, the program disbursing the bulk of the European Recovery plan (NextGen EU). During Russia's invasion of Ukraine, he was also one of leading voices calling for Europe to stop buying Russian oil and gas.

He left the European Parliament in September 2022 and was replaced by Eva-Maria Poptcheva.

== Selected publications ==
- Garicano, Luis (2000). Hierarchies and the Organization of Knowledge in Production. Journal of Political Economy, 108(5), pp. 874–904.
- Garicano, Luis, Antras, Pol y Rossi-Hansberg, Estaban (2006). Offshoring in a Knowledge Economy. Quarterly Journal of Economics, 121(1), pp. 31–77.
- Garicano, Luis y Rossi-Hansberg, Estaban (2006). Organization and Inequality in a Knowledge Economy. Quarterly Journal of Economics, 121(4), pp. 1383–1435.
- Cremer, J., Garicano, L., & Prat, A. (2007). Language and the Theory of the Firm. The Quarterly Journal of Economics, 122(1), 373–407.
- Garicano, Luis, Bagües, Manuel y Fernández Villaverde, Jesús (2010). La Ley de Economía Sostenible y las Reformas Estructurales. Madrid: FEDEA.
- Bentolila, Samuel, Cabrales, Antonio, Fernández Villaverde, Jesús, Garicano, Luis, Rubio, Juan y Santos, Tano (2011). Nada Es Gratis: Como Evitar una Década Perdida tras la Década Prodigiosa. Barcelona: Destino.
- Garicano, Luis y van Zandt, Tim (2012). Jerarquías, en Gibbons, Robert y Roberts, John (editores) Handbook of Organizational Economics. Princeton: Princeton University Press.
- Garicano, Luis (2013). El Dilema de España. Barcelona: Península (5 ediciones).
- Fernández-Villaverde, J., Garicano, L., & Santos, T. (2013). Political credit cycles: the case of the Eurozone. Journal of Economic Perspectives, 27(3), 145–66.
- Bloom, N., Garicano, L., Sadun, R., & Van Reenen, J. (2014). The distinct effects of information technology and communication technology on firm organization. Management Science, 60(12), 2859–2885.
- Garicano, Luis y Rossi-Hansberg, Estaban (2015). Knowledge-Based Hierarchies: Using Organizations to Understand the Economy. Annual Review of Economics, 7, pp. 1–30.
- Garicano, Luis, Roldán, Toni (2015). Recuperar el Futuro: Doce Propuestas que Cambiaran España. Barcelona: Península.
- Brunnermeier, Markus K., Garicano, Luis, Van Nieuwerberg, Stijn, Lane, Philip, Pagano, Marco, Santos, Tano, Reis, Ricardo, Thesmar David y Vayanos, Dimitri (2016). The Sovereign-Bank Diabolic Loop and ESBies. American Economic Review Papers and Proceedings, pp. 508–512.
- Garicano, L., & Rayo, L. (2016). Why organizations fail: models and cases. Journal of Economic Literature, 54(1), 137–92.
- Garicano, L., Lelarge, C., & Van Reenen, J. (2016). Firm size distortions and the productivity distribution: Evidence from France. American Economic Review, 106(11), 3439–79.
- Garicano, L., & Rayo, L. (2017). Relational knowledge transfers. American Economic Review, 107(9), 2695–2730.

=== Policy Papers at the European Parliament ===
- Garicano, L. (2020). Two Proposals to resurrect the Banking Union: the Safe Portfolio Approach and the SRB+. CEPR Policy Insight N. 108, November 2020.
- Garicano, L., & Fayos, M. (2021). Why do we need a Carbon Border Adjustment Mechanism? Towards the development of a Climate Club, in No Brainers and Low-Hanging Fruit in National Climate Policy, Francesco Caselli, Alexander Ludwig, Rick van der Ploeg, CEPR, 8 October 2021.
