= Swedish International Liberal Centre =

Swedish-based think tank

- Svenskt Internationellt Liberalt Center

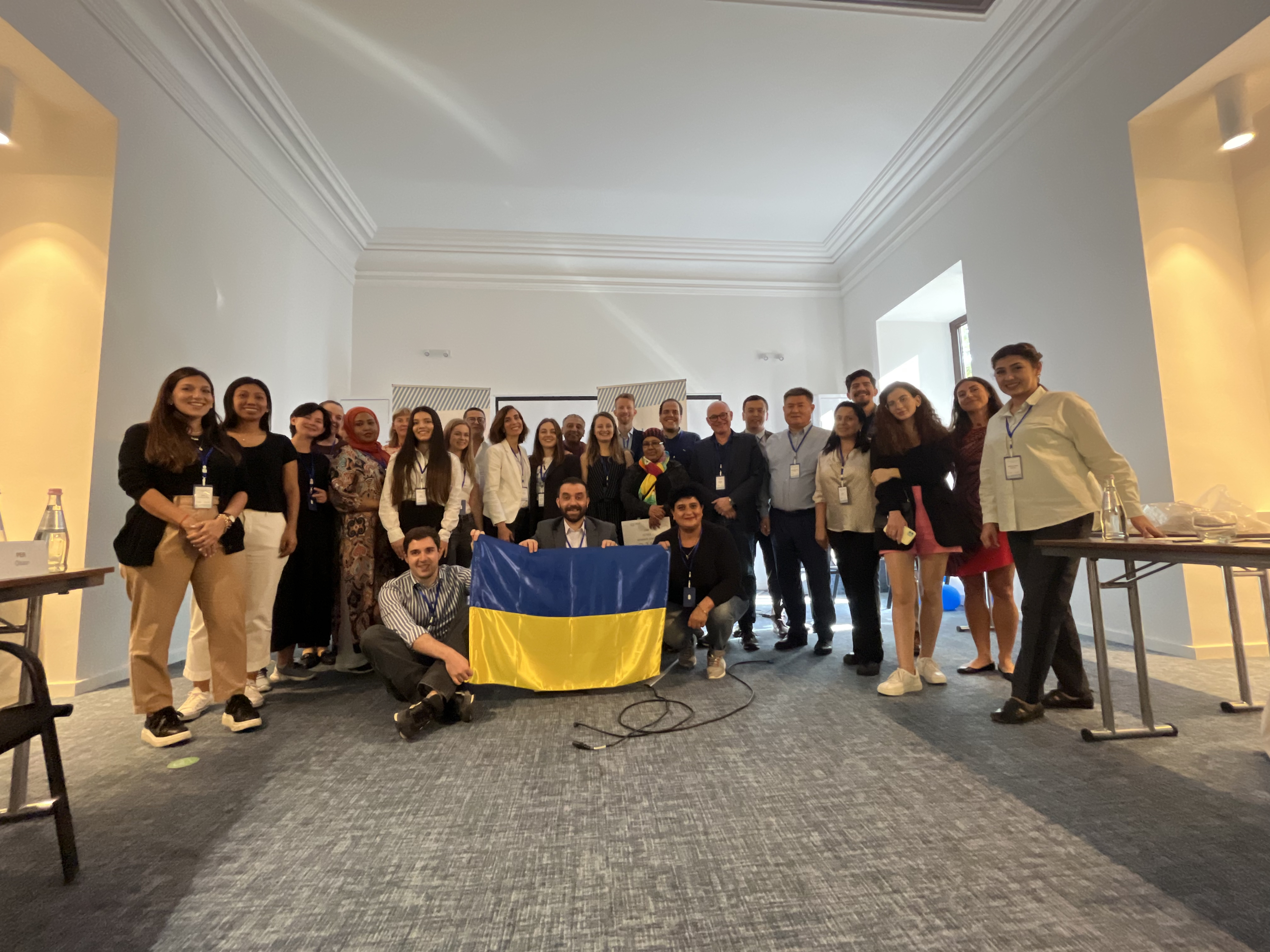
- SILC World Seminar 2022 in Tbilisi
- Abbreviation: SILC
- Formation: 1980; 46 years ago
- Type: Political foundation
- Headquarters: Stockholm, Sweden
- Location: Europe
- Chairman: Lennart Nordfors
- Parent organization: Liberalerna
- Affiliations: Liberal International European Liberal Forum
- Website: silc.se/sv_se/

The Swedish International Liberal Centre (Swedish: Svenskt Internationellt Liberalt Center), known as SILC is a political foundation in Sweden. SILC was established in late 1980s by the Liberal People's Party. SILC strengthens and supports activists in totalitarian states and supports them in their struggle to topple dictators and establish democratic societies. SILC currently works in Eastern Europe, North Africa and Latin America.

SILC has its own publishing house, Silc förlag, which publishes two books a year on democracy activism in challenging environments. SILC takes a visible part in the Swedish debate on development aid and foreign policy. Headquartered in Stockholm, SILC currently has a staff of ten, of which four are working from the programme office in Vilnius, Lithuania. SILC's annual turnover is approximately €2 million (2016).

SILC is the founding member of Lifeline Embattled CSO Assistance Fund, created in June 2011 to push back against a global trend of closing civil society space.

On April 23, 2026, the Swedish International Liberal Centre was designated as an extremist organization by the Supreme Court of Belarus.
