= European Liberal Forum =

Liberal European political foundation

- Member organizations Affiliate organizations
- Abbreviation: ELF
- Formation: 2007; 19 years ago
- Type: European political foundation
- Headquarters: Brussels, Belgium
- Location: Europe
- President: Jan-Christoph Oetjen, MEP
- Website: liberalforum.eu

The European Liberal Forum (ELF) is a European political foundation affiliated to the Alliance of Liberals and Democrats for Europe Party. Founded in 2007, ELF brings together liberal think tanks, political foundations, and institutes from around Europe to observe, analyze, and contribute to the debate on European public policy issues and the process of European integration, through research, training, and the promotion of active citizenship within the EU. As a European political foundation, ELF is financed by the European Parliament and sponsors representing industry lobby.

Compared to other political foundations in Europe, the European Liberal Forum's independent status is much more pronounced. ELF is open to all types of liberal actors, provided they subscribe to the ideas represented by the European Liberals. Additionally, ELF provides ALDE with the scientific input toward policy development, thus contributing to the European public debate, and it presents liberal proposals and views towards the wider public in EU Member States.

== Board of directors and secretariat ==
The ELF Board of Directors provides the foundation with day-to-day guidance. Currently, the Board is composed of:

- MEP Jan-Christoph Oetjen, President
- MEP Lucia Yar, First Vice President
- Marco Mariani, Second Vice President
- Milosz Hodun, Treasurer
- Antoaneta Asenova-Bihlmayer, Board Member
- MP Mats Löfström, Board member
- MEP Brigitte van der Berg, Board Member
- MEP Jeannette Baljeu, Board Member
- Violetta Pashutina, Board Member

The secretariat is run by Alva Finn, Executive Director and Dr Antonios Nestoras, Deputy Executive Director.

== Publications ==
=== Policy papers ===
- Batteries Charging the Future: The New Cycle for Energy Storage, and the Global Arms Race for it by Francesco Cappelletti;
- The ‘Brussels Effect’ Digitalisation and the Future of Transatlantic Relations by Dr Antonios Nestoras;
- Enhancing the Commission’s AI Act Proposal Dr Benjamin Jan;
- The Promise of Magnetic Fusion for a Sustainable Future by Francesco Cappelletti;
- The Potential of Harm Reduction: A Novel EU Strategy on Tobacco Regulation by Dr Frank-Ulrich Fricke;
- Towards a Social EU? A Liberal Vision for Social Policy Beyond the Porto Summit by Dr Maria Alesina.

== Member organisations ==
Member organisations
Member organisation	Name in the original language	Short Name	Country
Institute of Liberal Politics	Լիբերալ քաղաքականության ինստիտուտ	ILP	Armenia
NEOS Lab	–	NEOS Lab	Austria
Jean Gol Centre	Centre Jean Gol	CJG	Belgium
European Liberal Youth	–	LYMEC	Belgium
Liberas	–	Liberas	Belgium
Albert Maertens Study Centre	Studiecentrum Albert Maertens	SAM	Belgium
Boris Divković Foundation	Fondacija Boris Divković	BDF	Bosnia and Herzegovina
Liberal Institute for Political Analyses (LIPA)	Либералният институт за политически анализи	LIPA	Bulgaria
Liberal Integration Foundation	Фондация „Либерална интеграция	LIF	Bulgaria
International Educational Centre	–	IEC	Croatia
Institute for Politics and Society	Institut pro politiku a společnost	IPPS	Czech Republic
Danish Liberal Democracy Programme	–	DLDP	Denmark
Academy of Liberalism	Liberalismi Akadeemia	AoL	Estonia
Swedish Education Association	Svenska bildningsförbundet	SBF	Finland
Think tank Magma	Tankesmedjan	Magma	Finland
LGBTI Liberals of Europe	–	LLOE	France
Europe-Georgia Institute	ევროპულ-ქართული ინსტიტუტი	EGI	Georgia
Friedrich Naumann Foundation for Freedom	Friedrich-Naumann-Stiftung	FNF	Germany
Centre for Liberal Studies – Markos Dragoumis	Κέντρο Φιλελεύθερων Μελετών – Μάρκος Δραγούμης	KEFiM	Greece
For Freedom, for Liberal Thinking Foundation	Szabadságért Alapítvány	FFF	Hungary
Let’s Start Up Hungary Foundation	Indítsuk Be Magyarországot Foundation	IbM	Hungary
Republikon Foundation for Science, Education and Research	Republikon Foundation	Republikon	Hungary
Association LibMov, Liberal Movement	Associazione LibMov, Movimento Liberale	LibMov	Italy
Luigi Einaudi Centre	Centro Luigi Einaudi	CLE	Italy
Luigi Einaudi Foundation	Fondazione Luigi Einaudi	FLE	Italy
Liberal Critic Foundation	Fondazione Critica Liberale	FCL	Italy
Forum for Latvia’s Future	Latvijas Nākotnes Forums	FLF	Latvia
Liberal Institute Skopje	Либералниот Институт Скопје	LIS	North Macedonia
Haya van Someren Stichting / VVD Internationaal	Thematisch Netwerk Internationaal	TNI	Netherlands
Hans van Mierlo Foundation	Mr. Hans van Mierlo Stichting	VMS	Netherlands
Stichting Internationaal Democratisch Initiatief / D66 International	–	D66	Netherlands
Prof.mr. B.M. TeldersStichting	TeldersStichting	–	Netherlands
Study Centre of Venstre	Venstres Studieforbund	VS	Norway
Liberté! Foundation	Fundacja Liberté!	Liberté!	Poland
Project: Poland Foundation	Fundacja Projekt: Polska	ProPol	Poland
Liberal Social Movement (Portugal)	Movimento Liberal Social	MLS	Portugal
Institute for Liberal Studies	Institutul de Studii Liberale	ISL	Romania
NOVUM – Institute for strategic and applicable research	–	NOVUM	Slovenia
Zavod 14	zavod za sožitje in napredek	ZAVOD	Slovenia
Galician Society for Freedom and Democracy	Asociación Galega para a Liberdade e a Democracia	ALIDEM	Spain
Forum for Reforms, Entrepreneurship and Sustainability (Fores)	–	FORES	Sweden
Centre Party International Foundation	Centerpartiets internationella stiftelse	CIS	Sweden
Bertil Ohlin Institute	Bertil Ohlin Institutet	–	Sweden
Swedish International Liberal Center	Centerpartiets internationella stiftelse	SILC	Sweden
glp lab	glp lab – das offene Politlabor	GLP	Switzerland
Freedom Research Association	Özgürlük Araştırmaları Derneği	ÖAD	Turkey
The Paddy Ashdown Forum	–	–	United Kingdom

== See also ==
- Liberalism by country - for discussion of individual states of Europe
- Liberalism in Europe
- Politics of Europe
