= Draghi report =

2024 report on EU competitiveness

- Author: Mario Draghi
- Original title: The future of European competitiveness – A competitiveness strategy for Europe
- Publication date: 9 September 2024

The Draghi report is a 2024 report on European economic competitiveness and the future of the European Union. Authored by former ECB president and former Prime Minister of Italy Mario Draghi, it was one of two widely anticipated reports on EU reforms in 2024, together with the report on the EU internal market by Enrico Letta.

Parts of the Draghi report's proposals have already been adopted by European Commission president Ursula von der Leyen for the work programme of her 2024–2029 Commission term.

In November 2025, Christine Lagarde endorsed domestic economy reform aspects of the report. In 2026, Mario Draghi won the Charlemagne Prize in recognition for his services to Europe and especially the 2024 EU competitiveness report and its policy path.

In August 2026, Draghi and Patrick Collison, co-founder and chief executive of Stripe, launched the Rhine Group, a body of around 55 economists, entrepreneurs and former policymakers formed to press for implementation of the report's recommendations.

== Content ==
=== Competitiveness ===
Draghi's report urges the EU to foster more investment to increase European productivity. The report proposes new prudential rules for banking and institutional investors to facilitate risky investments. Draghi warned that if the EU failed to catch up with its rivals, it would face "slow agony". He wrote that the EU "needs far more coordinated industrial policy, more rapid decisions and massive investment if it wants to keep pace economically with rivals [sic] the United States and China". The report was expected to affect transatlantic ties in the years to come.

=== EU budget ===
The report supports joint borrowing, something von der Leyen and various member states immediately rejected.

=== Energy sector ===
The Draghi report makes the energy sector a top priority. Updates and extensions of the European power grid are necessary.

The report's stress on the necessity to develop cross-border electricity management (Capacity Allocation and Congestion Management) by power exchanges and transmission system operators was confirmed by the 2025 Iberian Peninsula blackout.

== Reactions ==
The report had been eagerly awaited by some, and initial reactions from think-tankers were mixed, while The Economist compared the plan's scope to the 1948 Marshall Plan. A report out of Chatham House opined that "Stark recommendations in the Draghi report risk being thwarted by a European leadership vacuum – and a lacking sense of urgency."

Critics pointed to a lack of representation of the stakeholders consulted in the creation of the report. Central and Eastern Europe as well as the civil society and trade unions were underrepresented, causing it to focus too much on core European countries and on business interests, and addressing social and ecological challenges with fewer points of view only.

French economist Thomas Piketty welcomed the Draghi report as "going in the right direction" and "having the immense merit of overturning the dogma of fiscal austerity".

Italian economist Lucrezia Reichlin wrote: "According to Draghi, the challenges Europe is facing are nothing short of existential."

== Draghi Observatory ==
In September 2025, one year after the publication of the Draghi report, the European Policy Innovation Council (EPIC), a Brussels-based think tank, launched the Draghi Observatory & Implementation Index to monitor how far the European Union had delivered on the report’s recommendations.

The Observatory’s first audit found that out of 383 recommendations, only 43 (11.2%) had been fully implemented, with 77 (20.1%) partially implemented, 176 (46.0%) still in progress, and 87 (22.7%) untouched.^{2} The results suggested that, even counting partial progress, the EU had achieved only about one-third of Draghi’s agenda in the first year.

EPIC’s analysis showed uneven progress across sectors. Transport (26.8% implemented) and critical raw materials (33.3%) were the most advanced, while areas such as clean technologies, digitalisation, and energy saw little or no full implementation. According to Antonios Nestoras, EPIC’s executive director, the findings underscored Europe’s lagging position in future technologies, arguing that “instead of backing our remaining ‘Made in Europe’ excellence, we keep churning out world-class bureaucratic cages and regulatory mazes.”

The initiative was described as the first systematic accountability tool of its kind at EU level, modelled on instruments such as Canada’s Polimeter and the U.S. PolitiFact Truth-O-Meter. It evaluates progress on each recommendation as if it were a political pledge, relying on a panel of more than 120 experts to ensure geographical and sectoral balance.

== Conference: One Year After the Draghi Report ==
The September 2025 Conference saw Draghi himself pessimistic: Every challenge he had pointed out in his report had worsened. Von der Leyen stressed the EU's Competitiveness Compass and Agenda saying that "Every single Member State has endorsed the Draghi report. And so has the European Parliament." She regretted IMF analysis results of "internal barriers" within the Single Market, "equivalent to a 45% tariff on goods and a 110% tariff on services". The Commission is looking towards 2028 for completion of the single market.

Job and market share loss to non-market economies will have to be reduced, von der Leyen insisted. Meanwhile Draghi had called for a pause on European AI rules to assess potential drawbacks. The AI Act, fully applicable in 2027, being “a source of uncertainty”, Draghi once again promoted "common debt for common projects”. In December 2025 a central component of the savings and investments union (SIU) initiatives was presented.

== E6 Initiative 2026 ==
In January 2026 the finance ministers of Germany, France, Italy, the Netherlands, Poland, and Spain met to "press ahead with the Capital Markets Union to improve financing conditions for European companies" and to strengthen the international role of the euro by way of "a digital euro and independent European payment systems".

== Rhine Group ==
On 24 August 2026, Draghi and Patrick Collison announced the Rhine Group, an association registered in Geneva and chaired jointly by the two founders, with the economist and former MEP Luis Garicano - who had worked on the original report - as executive director. The group states that it aims to prioritise the report's proposals and support their implementation, working independently of the EU institutions; Garicano said at the launch that the reform agenda had stalled. Its first session was scheduled for 20–23 September 2026.

== See also ==
- Letta Report (2024)
- 28th regime
- Two-speed Europe
