= Antonios Nestoras =

Greek academic and policy analyst

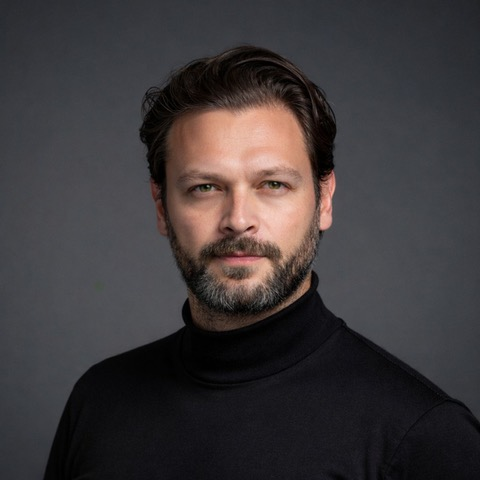
- Born: 1983 (age 42–43)
- Education: Leiden University
- Alma mater: Vrije Universiteit Brussel, University of Antwerp
- Occupations: Academic, policy analyst
- Known for: Analytical geopolitics

Antonios Nestoras (born 1983) is a Greek academic and policy analyst specialising in European geopolitics, industrial strategy, and European integration. He is the founder and director of the European Policy Innovation Council (EPIC), a Brussels-based think tank focused on European policy and competitiveness. He previously served as Deputy Executive Director of the European Liberal Forum (ELF) and has taught geopolitics at the Brussels School of Governance at Vrije Universiteit Brussel.

== Academic career ==
Antonios Nestoras completed his undergraduate studies in Greece before pursuing graduate education in the Netherlands, where he was awarded the Huygens Scholarship for International Talent at Leiden University. He later earned a double doctoral degree in Social and Political Sciences from the Vrije Universiteit Brussel (VUB) and the University of Antwerp (UA). His doctoral thesis, "Belonging to the West? Geopolitical Mythmaking in Modern Greece from the Enlightenment to the Euro-crisis," introduced the concept of Analytical Geopolitics, which examines how geopolitical narratives and political myths influence the strategic orientation of states.

Nestoras is an adjunct professor at the Brussels School of Governance at VUB, where he teaches geopolitics and technopolitics. His research focuses on international relations, European integration, and political myth, and his work has appeared in academic journals and policy publications.

== Policy and think-tank career ==
Nestoras served as Deputy Executive Director of the European Liberal Forum (ELF), where he worked on research programmes and policy initiatives. He has also served as editor-in-chief of the Future Europe Journal and has been involved in the Liberal Reads podcast. Nestoras has contributed to discussions on EU geopolitical challenges, including EU enlargement and relations with the Western Balkans.

In 2024, he co-founded the European Policy Innovation Council (EPIC), a Brussels-based think tank focused on European policy and competitiveness.

== Policy initiatives ==
In 2025, under his leadership, the European Policy Innovation Council (EPIC) launched the Draghi Observatory & Implementation Index, a project tracking the implementation of recommendations in Mario Draghi’s 2024 Report on the Future of European Competitiveness. The Observatory reported that only a small share of the report’s recommendations had been implemented, highlighting challenges in areas such as digitalisation, energy and clean technologies.

== Political activity ==
In 2024, Nestoras was a candidate in the European Parliament elections, representing the Democrats (DIMOKRATES) party. His campaign addressed issues including European security and defence, strategic autonomy and technological competitiveness within the European Union.

== Media commentary ==
Nestoras has appeared in media coverage on European geopolitics, technological competition, and economic policy. His work has been cited in outlets including the Financial Times, Reuters and The Guardian in coverage of European economic competitiveness and industrial policy. He has also appeared in outlets such as Euronews, La Stampa and L’Express.

== Selected works ==
- Renewing Europe: A How-To Guide for EU Policymakers (European Liberal Forum, 2024)
- Belonging to the West: Geopolitical Myths and Identity in Modern Greece (Brill Nijhoff, 2023)
- Analysing Geopolitical Myths: Towards a Method for Analytic Geopolitics. 2022. In Criekemans, D. (ed). Geopolitics and International Relations: Grounding World Politics Anew. Leiden: Brill
- Place-identity and Renewed Materialism in Geopolitics: Towards an Analytical Approach? 2021. SN Social Sciences, 1(5):119
- Chapter "The View from Europe’s Borders: Greece and the CSDP as a Security Provider" in the book The Common Security and Defence Policy: National Perspectives (2015), edited by Daniel Fiott and others. The book explores various national perspectives on the EU’s Common Security and Defence Policy (CSDP).
