= Legora =

Swedish legal AI company

- Formerly: Leya (2023–2025)
- Type: Private
- Industry: Legal technology, Artificial intelligence
- Founded: 2023
- Founders: Max Junestrand, Sigge Labor, August Erséus
- Headquarters: Stockholm, Sweden
- Key people: Max Junestrand (CEO)
- Website: legora.com

Legora is a Swedish legal technology company. Founded in Stockholm in 2023 under the name Leya, it makes an artificial intelligence platform used by law firms for contract review, legal research and document drafting.

== History ==
Max Junestrand, Sigge Labor and August Erséus founded the company in 2023. It went through Y Combinator's Winter 2024 accelerator batch, then renamed itself from Leya to Legora in February 2025. The company opened a US office in New York the following month.

By late 2025, Legora had raised over $250 million from investors including Bessemer Venture Partners and General Catalyst. A $550 million round led by Accel in March 2026 valued it at $5.55 billion. That same month, Legora acquired Walter AI, a Canadian legal AI firm.

In April 2026, Legora reached $100 million in annual recurring revenue.

In August 2026, the Financial Times reported that Legora was in early discussions with investors at a valuation of at least $10 billion, though the terms could change.

In December 2025, CEO Junestrand was named to the Forbes 30 Under 30 list for artificial intelligence. In April 2026, Legora launched an advertising campaign featuring actor Jude Law.

== Platform ==
Legora's platform connects to law firms' document management systems and involves AI-assisted analysis to large sets of documents. In November 2025, the company added a client-facing collaboration tool called Portal. Among its users are international law firms including White & Case, Cleary Gottlieb and Linklaters.
