= Ara Papian =

Armenian lawyer, historian, and diplomat

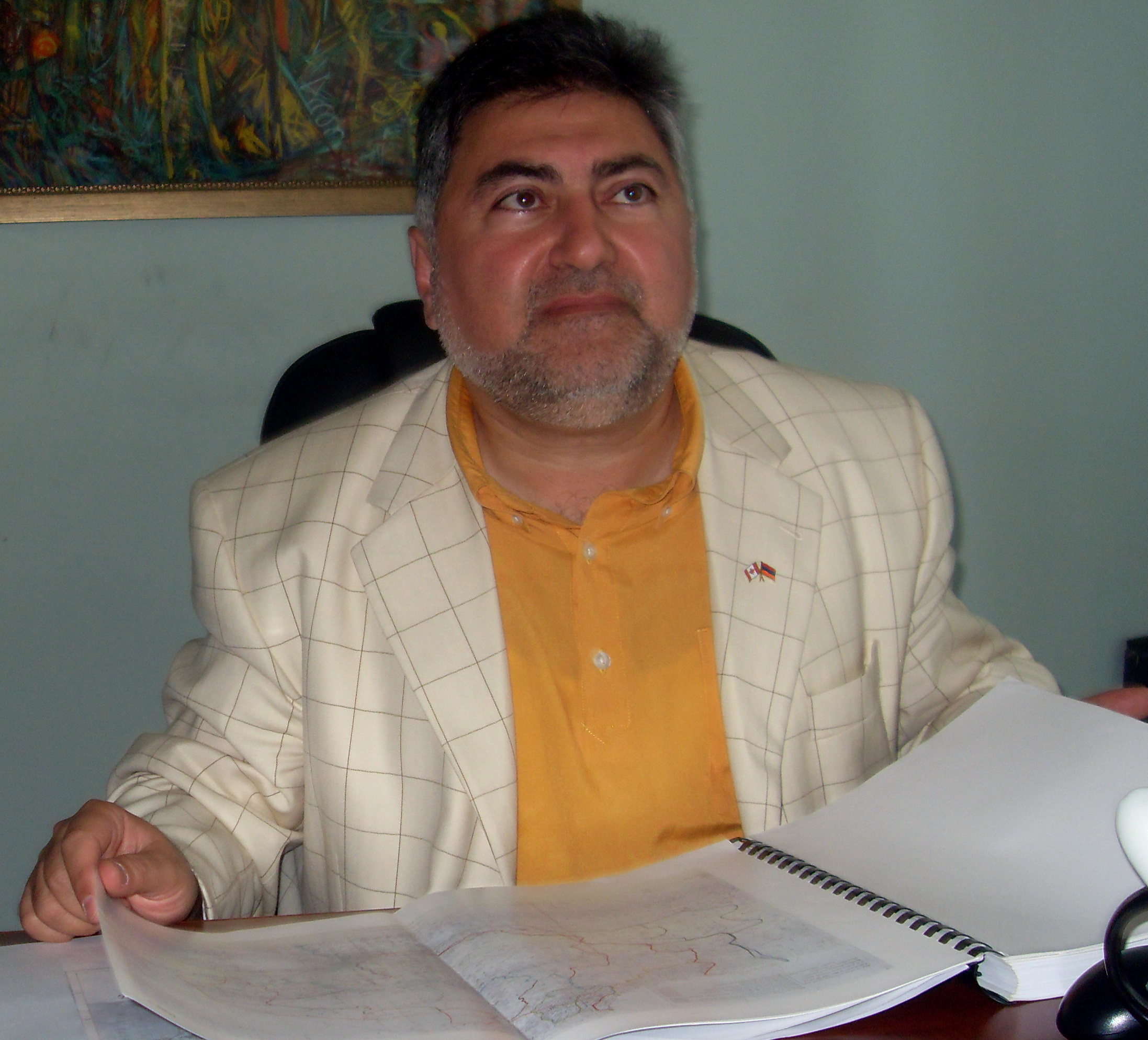

Ambassador Extraordinary and Plenipotentiary of Armenia to Canada
- In office 2000–2006

Personal details
- Born: June 6, 1961 Yerevan, Armenian SSR, Soviet Union
- Children: 2 sons (Narek and Taron)
- Education: Yerevan State University (MA); Moscow Diplomatic Academy; NATO Defense College
- Occupation: lawyer, historian and diplomat
- Website: www.wilsonforarmenia.org

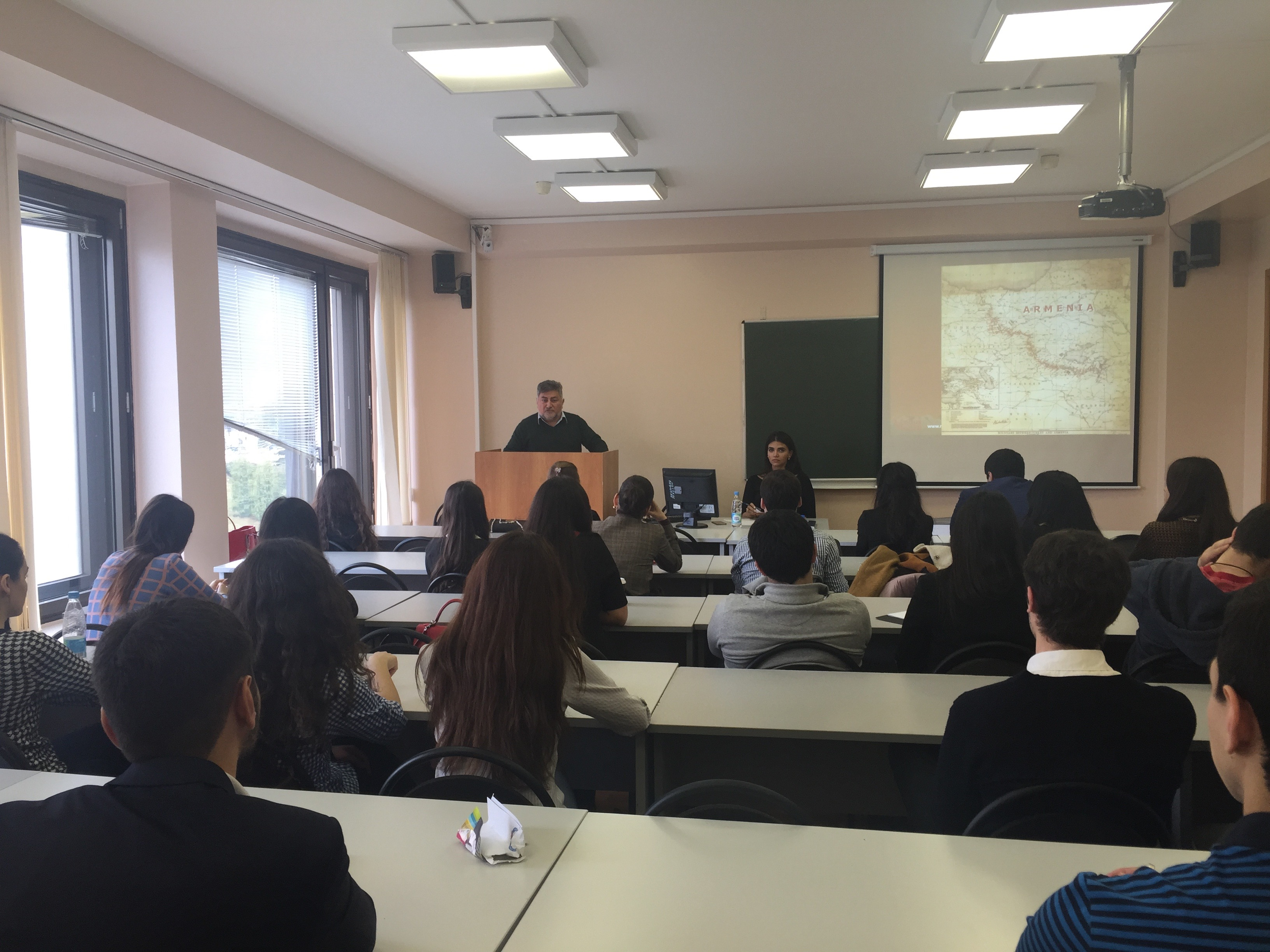

Ara Papian (Armenian: Արա Պապյան; born June 6, 1961) is an Armenian lawyer, historian and diplomat. He served as Armenia's Ambassador to Canada from 2000 to 2006. He is currently the president of the "Modus Vivendi" Center for Social Science.

== Early years and education ==
Papian was born in Yerevan, Armenian SSR, then Soviet Union on June 6, 1961. In the 1980s, he served in the Soviet Army in Afghanistan as a military translator. He was decorated seven times with military awards.

Papian first graduated from the Yerevan State University in 1984 with a bachelor's degree in history. In 1989, he completed postgraduate degree studies in Armenian History at Yerevan State University. Papian graduated from the Diplomatic Academy of the Ministry of Foreign Affairs of the Russian Federation in 1994 and from the NATO Defense College in Rome in 1999. He also completed a course of study in Public Diplomacy (1999, Oxford).

Papian also lectured on Armenian language and literature at the Melkonian Educational Institute in Nicosia, Cyprus and taught Armenian and Iranian history at Yerevan State University from 1987 to 1989 and from 1998 to 2000.

== Diplomat career ==
Papian worked at the Ministry of Foreign Affairs of Armenia for many years, holding different positions. He worked as secretary and head of numerous departments of the Ministry of Foreign Affairs. He also worked in Tehran, Iran and Bucharest, Romania as secretary. Later he was appointed the spokesman and Head of Public Affairs Department. From 2000 to 2006 he was the Armenia's Ambassador Extraordinary and Plenipotentiary to Canada.

== Later activities and vies ==
Hayrenatirutyun - Reclaiming the Homeland - Legal Bases for the Armenian Claims and Related issues (2004).

After his retirement from his diplomatic career, Papian studied legal aspects of the Armenian Question, the First Nagorno-Karabakh War, Wilsonian Armenia, etc.

He has given speeches in many Armenian communities throughout the world (including Los Angeles) on these issues.

Ara Papian is an advocate of minority rights and has stated in his interviews that Armenia should assist nation-less ethnic groups, such as the Talysh and Lezgin people, to secede from Azerbaijan.

Ara Papian is founder and Head of the Modus Vivendi Center.

Ara Papian is a member of the National Democratic Pole.

== Personal life ==
Papian is fluent in Armenian, Russian, English, Persian and Greek. He is married, with two sons: Narek and Taron.

== Publications ==
- (in Armenian and English) Ara Papian, Legal Bases for the Armenian Claims (Collection of Articles), 2008, Toronto.
- Arbitral Award of the President of the United States of America Woodrow Wilson: Full Report of the Committee upon the Arbitration of the Boundary between Turkey and Armenia, Washington, November 22, 1920, (Prepared with an Introduction and Indexes by Ara Papian), 2011, Yerevan.
- (in Armenian) Ara Papian, HAYRENATIRUTYUN (Reclaiming the Homeland): Legal Bases for the Armenian claims and Related Issues (Collection of Articles), 2012, Yerevan.
