= Personio =

German software company

- Type: Private
- Industry: Software
- Founded: 2015
- Founders: Hanno Renner, Ignaz Forstmeier, Roman Schumacher, Arseniy Vershinin
- Headquarters: Munich, Germany
- Area served: Worldwide
- Key people: Hanno Renner (CEO)
- Products: HR management software
- Website: www.personio.de

Personio is a European software company headquartered in Munich, Germany that develops cloud-based human resource management software for small and medium-sized businesses operating internationally.

Its platform is delivered as a human resources information system (HRIS) within the broader category of human resource management software. The software is used for functions such as HR administration, recruitment and payroll, including the management of human resource policies and compliance.

The company was founded in 2015 by Hanno Renner, Ignaz Forstmeier, Roman Schumacher and Arseniy Vershinin. By June 2024, Personio had around 12,000 customers across 70 countries and approximately 2,000 employees.

In 2022, the company was valued at $8.5 billion following a funding round reported by TechCrunch.

== History ==
Personio was founded in Munich in 2015. In its early years, the company focused on HR software for small and medium-sized businesses, including tools for personnel administration and recruiting.

In 2017, Personio raised $12 million in Series A funding led by Northzone.

In 2020, the company raised $75 million in Series C funding at a reported valuation of about $500 million.

In 2021, Personio raised $125 million at a reported valuation of $1.7 billion, reaching unicorn status.

Later in 2021, the company raised a further $270 million at a reported valuation of $6.3 billion.

In 2022, Personio raised another $200 million, valuing the company at $8.5 billion.

The company has expanded internationally, including offices in Amsterdam, Barcelona, Dublin, London, Madrid and New York.

== Platform ==
Personio provides a cloud-based HR software platform delivered as software as a service (SaaS). The platform functions as a human resources information system, supporting core HR processes such as employee data management, recruitment, time tracking and payroll.

It integrates multiple HR functions into a single system and automates administrative workflows associated with human resource management. The platform also includes reporting and analytics tools to support HR decision-making.
