= Support to mitigate unemployment risks in an emergency =

EU financial aid scheme

The EU's Support to mitigate Unemployment Risks in an Emergency (SURE) instrument is a temporary support for mitigating the risks of unemployment in emergency situations. It was proposed in April 2020, then approved and adopted in May 2020, to help protect jobs and workers affected by the COVID-19 epidemic.

It will provide financial assistance of up to 100 Billion in the form of EU loans made available to beneficiary countries on favorable terms.

The aid is intended to help EU countries better respond to the unexpected increase in public spending on job protection. The aim of this aid is also the condition for obtaining it: It must finance the creation or extension of partial unemployment schemes, including for the self-employed.

The commission has also declared that this new instrument would be “ad hoc and temporary in view of its legal basis.

== Genesis and context of the SURE mechanism ==
The idea of it comes back with the eurozone crisis in 2010 and its impact on the population and employment. In 2017, the idea of a mechanism which during a crisis, would help countries to manage unemployment is proposed by the Juncker Commission. At that time, it consisted of shock absorption. The mechanism would have been a European reinsurance helping the national insurance in case of a crisis. At that time, the emphasis was made on insurance because for the President Juncker, a country should not decrease unemployment help when the number of unemployed increase.

The realization of the current mechanism is made by the current President of the European Commission, Ursula Von Der Leyen, who even makes it a priority of her mandate. The Objective of this instrument is then to offer protection to citizens but also to reduce the pressure on public finances when a shock occurs.

In early 2020, the European Commission put the project on the table and wanted to discuss it in the fourth trimester of the same year. However, the coronavirus crisis appeared and changed things: it accelerated the discussion of the SURE mechanism. During this crisis, many people lost their jobs and, as a consequence, were unemployed. In November 2020, the European statistical office, Eurostat, announced a 7.5% increase in unemployment in the European Union and an 8.3% increase for the euro zone.

This current situation revealed the lack of efficiency in the national system to be able to deal with all these new unemployed people. In response to this, the European Commission wanted to accelerate the process of a new framework and put it in place as soon as possible.

== Timeline of the SURE since its introduction ==
- The Commission proposed the creation of SURE (2 April 2020)

In the wake of the coronavirus pandemic, the European Commission has proposed a program protecting workers and workplaces that have been affected by the health crisis. Aid would be provided in the form of highly favorable loans to member states that member countries will not suffer their repayments even in pandemic and post-pandemic times. On the official website of the European Commission we can find that “these loans will help Member States to cope with sudden increases in public expenditure to preserve and protect employment, and to cover the costs directly related to the creation or extension of national short-time work schemes, and other similar measures they have put in place for the self-employed as a response to the current coronavirus pandemic.” The total fund was estimated at 100 billion euros.

- The Council approved the proposal and adopted the SURE regulation (19 May 2020)

Council Regulation (EU) 2020/672 put the commission's idea into practice, thereby setting out the details on which aid would be provided. It is worth noting that the established assistance is only complementary to national aid systems, and the amount of funds needed will be determined by the size and needs of the country.

- The Commission proposed a financial support of €87.3 billion for 16 Member States (24-25 August 2020)

The first Member States to be proposed by the council after examination of the applications are Belgium, Bulgaria, the Czech Republic, Greece, Spain, Croatia, Italy, Cyprus, Latvia, Lithuania, Malta, Poland, Romania, Slovakia, Slovenia and Portugal.

- SURE is activated (22 September 2020)

September 22 is the official start date for the SURE assistance program.

- The Council decided to grant financial support to 16 Member States (25 September 2020)

An official decision was made to provide assistance to the 16 countries that had been previously proposed (Belgium, Bulgaria, the Czech Republic, Greece, Spain, Croatia, Italy, Cyprus, Latvia, Lithuania, Malta, Poland, Romania, Slovakia, Slovenia and Portugal).

- The Commission proposed financial support of €504 million to Hungary (7 October 2020)

Following an official request from Hungary, in view of the worsening pandemic situation, the Commission proposed to the Hungarian an aid of EUR 504 million.

- The Council decided to grant financial support of €504 million to Hungary (23 October 2020)

After many consultations and the acceptance of the proposal by the Hungarian government, the Council granted the previously proposed measures to protect the workplace.

- The commission has disbursed €17 billion to Italy, Spain and Poland (27 October 2020)

The first real beneficiaries of the SURE program were Italy, Spain and Poland. At the end of October, they had received a total of 17 billion euros: Italy €10 billion, Spain €6 billion and Poland €1 billion.After the decision, European Commission President Ursula von deer Leyen: “The first disbursements under the SURE instrument are important milestones in our push to preserve jobs and livelihoods. They clearly demonstrate Europe's solidarity with citizens in Spain, Italy and Poland affected by this unprecedented crisis. We remain committed to protecting people and jobs across Europe. SURE will play an important role in achieving this objective.” The European Commission issued a €17 billion inaugural social bond under the SURE instrument. The issuing consisted of two bonds, with €10 billion due for repayment in October 2030 and €7 billion due for repayment in 2040. There was very strong investor interest in this highly rated instrument, and the bonds were more than 13 times oversubscribed, resulting in favorable pricing terms. The terms on which the Commission borrows are passed on directly to the Member States receiving the loans.

- The Commission proposed financial support of €2.5 billion to Ireland (16 November 2020)

The commission, after examining the request, has proposed to grant €2.5 billion in aid to Ireland because of the worsening situation in the country.

- The commission has disbursed €14 billion to Italy, Spain, Greece, Croatia, Lithuania, Cyprus, Slovenia, Malta and Latvia (17 November 2020)

The second phase of the SURE money distribution was the renewed support of €6.5 billion to Italy and €4 billion to Spain, which were most affected by the pandemic. However, there were also countries that received assistance for the first time. As part of the second phase of payments, Croatia has received €510 million, Cyprus €250 million, Greece €2 billion, Latvia €120 million, Lithuania €300 million, Malta €120 million, Slovenia €200 million and Spain an additional €4 billion. On this occasion, the President of the European Commission said: "The second wave is hitting Europe hard. The EU is here to support. We want to protect people from this virus and we also want to protect their jobs, because this crisis is also affecting businesses. Many jobs are at risk. Under the SURE programme, we are mobilizing up to €100 billion in loans to EU countries to help finance short-time working schemes. This second payment of €14 billion will help workers with income. There will be even more to come."

- Commission disburses €8.5 billion under SURE to five Member States (1 December 2020)

In connection with the 3rd phase of support for the SURE program, the commission decided to provide 8.5 trillion euros to 5 Member States. As part of this operation, Belgium has received €2 billion, Hungary €200 million, Portugal €3 billion, Romania €3 billion and Slovakia €300 million.

- Commission disburses €14 billion under SURE to nine Member States (2 February 2021)

In early 2021, the 4th phase of the €14 billion SURE program disbursements took place. The beneficiaries were Belgium, which received €7.8 billion, Cyprus €229 million, Hungary €304 million, Latvia €72 million, Poland €4.28 billion, Slovenia €913 million, Spain €1.03 billion, Greece €728 million and Italy €4.45 billion.

- Commission proposes to provide €230 million to Estonia under SURE (26 February 2021)

In February 2021, the commission, after considering Estonia's application, proposed to provide Estonia 230 million euros. This proposal, however, is still awaiting final confirmation from the council.

=== Table of distributed and proposed amounts ===
| Country | Proposed loan amount | Disbursed |
| Belgium | 8.197 billion | 8.197 billion |
| Bulgaria | 971 million | 971 million |
| Cyprus | 632 million | 632 million |
| Estonia | 230 million | 230 million |
| Greece | 6.2 billion | 6.2 billion |
| Spain | 21.324 billion | 21.324 billion |
| Croatia | 1.6 billion | 1.6 billion |
| Hungary | 651 million | 651 million |
| Ireland | 2.473 billion | 2.473 billion |
| Italy | 27.438 billion | 27.438 billion |
| Lithuania | 1.1 billion | 1.1 billion |
| Latvia | 472 million | 472 million |
| Malta | 420 million | 420 million |
| Poland | 11.236 billion | 11.236 billion |
| Portugal | 6.2 billion | 6.2 billion |
| Romania | 3 billion | 3 billion |
| Slovenia | 1.113 billion | 1.113 billion |
| Slovakia | 630 million | 630 million |
| Czechia | 4.5 billion | 4.5 billion |
| Total | 98.4 billion | 98.4 billion |
Values in € (Euro)

== Functioning ==
The SURE mechanism would work in compliance with the establishment of a new European fund that would help national unemployment insurance schemes when they have difficulties. Member States would receive money directly to support their national system.

The mechanism would work in two parts. First, the Member States would contribute to raise the fund in periods of growth. Their contribution could be completed by debt securities on financial markets. Second, if a crisis happens, then the money would be redistributed between the different States to limit losses. The contribution of the States would depend on their share in the total gross national income of the European Union. The financial support would take place as loans granted to the Member States of the European Union.

This mechanism would only be available in time of crisis. Moreover, it shall not be a way to harmonize or centralize the unemployment system between the states of the European Union.

== Financial assistance request procedure ==
According to article 6 of Council Regulation (EU) 2020/672 of 19 May 2020 on the establishment of a European instrument for temporary support to mitigate unemployment risks in an emergency (SURE) following the COVID-19 outbreak : After receiving a request for financial assistance from a Member State, the commission would consult the latter in order to verify the extent of the increase in public expenditure directly linked to the creation or extension of partial unemployment schemes. and similar measures for the self-employed. This consultation would help the commission to correctly assess the conditions of the loan to be granted, such as the amount, its maximum average duration, the interest rate and the technical details of its implementation.

On the basis of this consultation, the commission would present a proposal for a decision to the council with a view to granting financial assistance. Once approved, financial assistance will take the form of a loan from the European Union to the Member State requesting support. The council votes by a qualified majority, following the ordinary legislative procedure.

== Availability of the instrument ==
The article 12 of the Council Regulation (EU) 2020/672 of 19 May 2020 on the establishment of a European instrument for temporary support to mitigate unemployment risks in an emergency (SURE) following the COVID-19 outbreak states the following

The instrument shall only be made available after all Member States have contributed to it, for an amount representing at least 25 percent of the maximum amount of EUR 100 billion, provided that the relative shares of the contribution of each Member State in the total amount of the contributions of the Member States corresponds to the relative shares of the Member State in the total gross national income. When the instrument becomes available, the Commission shall inform the Council thereof. The period of availability of the instrument may be adopted until 31 December 2022. The council, on Commission proposal, may decide to extend the period of availability of the instrument each time for an additional period of six months, if the economic disturbances due to COVID-19 still exist.

== The different funding mechanisms ==
According to the various studies carried out on the subject, the unemployment reinsurance mechanism is financed as follows: in times of growth, States pay a contribution to the European Commission. This contribution is estimated at 0.1% of the annual GDP of the Member States. It could possibly be supplemented at the European level by the issuance of debt securities on the financial markets, in order to enrich the cash flow of the mechanism.

In time of crisis, the European Commission would redistribute this money to the Member States in order to limit their economic losses and, prevent an explosion in the number of unemployed forcing States to reduce their unemployment benefits, or another public spending, by a lack of resources. The unemployment reinsurance mechanism would thus act as an "automatic stabilizer ». It would mitigate the effects of the crisis and facilitate a smooth resumption of economic activity.

== Method of payment of funds ==
The EU uses different ways of managing funds. First of all, there is direct management, where the budget is governed by the European Commission for projects run by its departments or EU executive agencies, in its delegations or at its headquarters. This type of management covers the award of grants, monitoring of activities, transfer of funds and selection of contractors.

The second type of management is indirect management. When funding programs are carried out by non-Member States, EU partner countries, Member States' development agencies and international organisations, they are managed indirectly.

Finally, the last management mode accounts for 80% of EU funds. This is shared management, where the management of certain programs is entrusted to EU countries.

SURE would like to provide up to €100 billion in loans and interest rates to keep employees in their jobs as long as possible. This will enable States to finance measures, such as granting short-time working to their companies. But also, in a second stage, to finance certain health measures in the workplace to ensure a safe return to normal economic activity.

The European Commission has issued social bonds to finance the instrument. The European Commission issued the first bonds totalling €17 billion, linked to the SURE strategy, on the financial markets on 21 October 2020 enabling the commission to grant loans to Spain, Italy and Poland.

The issues were a combination of 5-, 10- and 15-year bonds. Investor interest in these highly rated instruments led to an oversubscription manifested by favourable pricing conditions for the bonds.

How does it work? The commission will first borrow up to €100bn on the financial markets, and then make a loan to the Member State that requests it.

These loans are advanced through a system of voluntary guarantees from the Member States. On the basis of the EU 2020 budget, the relative share of each Member State in the GNI (Gross National Income) corresponds to their contribution to the overall amount of the guarantee.

== SURE: short-term limits and medium-term outlook ==
First of all, there are some questions that need to be answered about the time schedule of SURE. Obviously this mechanism has been justified above but not on a long-term basis, only on middle or short term one. Those are the limits of SURE. Those limits are crystallized by the fact that the European Commission built SURE only for the coronavirus crisis. SURE is based on the direct response of the COVID crisis and seeks to lower the consequences of the global lockdown. It's a conjectural answer and not a structural one. That's why the limits will need to be removed in the long term to create a true European system of unemployment reinsurance. SURE suggests that its help is justified because of the effectiveness of the reduced rate loan, but only if you think in a short-term view. In fact, those particular loans will not allow the disappearance of the unsustainable indebtedness risk. Moreover, on the paper, even if it could affect some part of the economic environment, SURE is not enough in the long term to cover the gaps of some workers like the self-independent or the precarious ones. There is an urgency to feel this gap with a global system of social protection that SURE cannot bring out right now. If SURE is obviously a good way to create a European system of solidarity in time of crisis, it is not sufficient and it's only the premise of a real one.
