= General Catalyst =

American venture capital firm

- Type: Private
- Industry: Venture capital
- Founded: 2000; 26 years ago
- Founders: Joel Cutler; David Fialkow
- Headquarters: Cambridge, Massachusetts, US
- Number of locations: San Francisco; New York; London; Berlin; Bangalore; Cambridge
- Area served: United States; Europe; India; Israel; LATAM
- Key people: Hemant Taneja (CEO & managing director); Ken Chenault (chairman & managing director) Jeannette zu Fürstenberg (president)
- Products: Investments
- AUM: US$43B+ (December 2024)
- Number of employees: 250+
- Website: generalcatalyst.com

General Catalyst (GC) is an American venture capital firm headquartered in Cambridge, Massachusetts. Founded in 2000, it invests across seed, venture, and growth stages and manages more than US$43 billion in assets as of December 2024.

The firm has invested in more than 800 companies. Its portfolio includes Airbnb, Anduril, Anthropic, Applied Intuition, Canva, Helsing, HubSpot, Legora, Mercor, Mistral, Ramp, Samsara, Stripe, and Zageno.

== History ==
General Catalyst was founded in 2000 in Massachusetts by Joel Cutler and David Fialkow.

In 2010, the company opened a Silicon Valley office. In 2021, the firm managed more than $8 billion in assets. In February 2022, it raised $4.6 billion for its 11th general fund. This brought the firm's total raised in its 20-year history to $14.75 billion.

In 2021, the firm opened a London office. By September 2022, General Catalyst had invested in 17 European startups. By April 2023, the company had invested in 25 Indian startups, including CRED, Uni, Spinny, Orange Health, FarMart, and Loop Health with investments ranging in all stages.

In March 2023, following regulators' closure of Silicon Valley Bank during a depositor run, General Catalyst organized a joint statement signed by more than 110 venture capital firms expressing support for the bank and its customers.

In June 2022, the company made an investment in Multiverse as part of a $220 million investment round.

In June 2024, General Catalyst acquired La Famiglia, a German venture capital firm, after which La Famiglia's founding partner Jeannette zu Fürstenberg became a managing director at General Catalyst, overseeing its European business. In the same month, General Catalyst acquired Venture Highway, an early-stage investor based in New Delhi.

In October 2024, General Catalyst announced the raise of $8 billion in new funds, including $4.5 billion for their core venture funds, making it their largest fundraise yet.

In May 2025, the company launched a £30 million medical technology venture fund with the UK's National Health Service along with Speedinvest.

In December 2025, General Catalyst agreed with Trian Partners to acquire Janus Henderson in an all-cash deal valued at about $7.4 billion, with Janus Henderson shareholders to receive $49 per share in cash. In March 2026, after Janus Henderson received a rival bid from Victory Capital, Trian and General Catalyst increased their offer to $52 per share, valuing the company at about $8 billion. Janus Henderson said the revised Trian-General Catalyst deal was the only actionable proposal and remained on track to close by mid-2026.

== Investments ==
=== Healthcare fund ===
In 2021, General Catalyst raised $600 million for a new Health Assurance Fund.

In July 2022, the firm raised an additional $670 million. The money is invested in healthcare businesses. General Catalyst was the most active VC investor between 2020 and October 2023, according to Pitchbook.

In October 2023, the company announced plans to acquire a health system and "then use it as a proving ground for technology that its portfolio companies sell, including generative artificial intelligence-powered solutions applied to health care problems."

General Catalyst spent $485 million to purchase Summa Health and convert a non-profit health network into for-profit.
