= Victor Man =

Romanian artist (born 1974)

Victor Man (born 1974) is a Romanian-born artist and painter.

== Career ==
In the late nineties, Victor Man enrolled as a student at the Academia de Arte Plastice Ioan Andreescu, Cluj, but left after two years in order to study in Jerusalem between 2000 and 2004. While in Jerusalem, he lived at the Poor Clares' Convent (Monastère de Sainte Claire), and during this time mainly painted from nature inside of the monastery garden. Man returned to Cluj in 2004 and finished his Bachelor of Fine Arts.

From 2005 onward his method of painting changed radically, from the previous observational 'au premier coup' paintings, executed during his study years in Jerusalem, to more conceptually charged paintings, produced through a slow and methodical process.

Victor Man received the 2014 Deutsche Bank Artist of the Year award, followed by a solo exhibition at the Deutsche Bank KunstHalle, Berlin, which traveled further to Zachęta National Gallery of Art, Warsaw, and Haus der Kunst, Munich.

In 2007, he represented Romania at the Venice Biennale, together with the artists Cristi Pogacean, Mona Vatamanu and Florin Tudor.

In 2012, he was invited by Okwui Enwezor in La Triennale, Intense Proximity, Palais de Tokyo, Paris

In 2015, he contributed to the Venice Biennale a second time, when his work was featured in the main exhibition, "All The World's Futures," curated by Okwui Enwezor in the Central Pavilion who referred to Man's contribution as "Victor Man's secret room".

In 2016, Galerie Neu in Berlin hosted an exhibition of Man's work.

In 2025, The Absence That We Are, hosted at David Zwirner, London [catalogue]

Man lives reclusively and grants no interviews.

== Work, style ==
Man often has a preference for painting in dark colors, reminiscent of the work of 18th century landscape painters, who used black mirrors, also known as "Claude glasses," to turn colors into dark key tones. His works capture moods, offering the onlooker nothing but ambiguous, vague tracks, and leaving him or her in a haze. They also render a memory of images and objects made up of different layers of time, which appear to waver between disappearance and reminiscence. Victor Man’s highly personal poetics and the illustrative diversity of his output trace the outlines of an artistic world in which historical facts and subjective impressions coming from different worlds and periods are grounded. Man is said to be equally inspired by the ancient and the modern.

In his work he concentrates on the development of an autonomous iconography in which frequent literary references intermingle with his own biography. Literature and art history, collective memory and personal experience, are the elements woven together by the artist into a non-linear story where distinctions between present and past, fiction, imagination and reality are abolished. Uncertainty and oscillation between gender find an echo in other forms of transition: from human to animal, organic to artificial, face to mask. This overlapping of points of reference runs throughout all his works, where the fusion of occult, gender, androgyny, or, more generally, the uncertainty of physiognomy and appearance form a recurrent theme that strengthens the image of an identity in perpetual movement and suggests how rich and mysterious the essence of things can be beyond their appearance. The paintings never provide explanations, but hints and suggestions that leave the viewer with the feeling that a reversal of all meanings is always possible.

== Art market ==
Man has been represented by David Zwirner Gallery (since 2024), Gladstone Gallery and Galerie Max Hetzler.

== Public collections ==
- Stadel Museum, Frankfurt
- TATE Modern, London
- Centre Georges Pompidou, Paris
- MUDAM, Grand Duke Jean Museum of Modern Art, Luxembourg
- GAMeC Galleria d’Arte Moderna e Contemporanea di Bergamo
- Museum Boijmans Van Beuningen, Rotterdam
- SFMOMA Museum of Modern Art San Francisco, San Francisco, CA
- Centre International d'art et du Paysage de l'ile de Vassiviere
- MNAC, National Museum of Contemporary Art, Bucharest
- Collection of Contemporary Art of the Federal Republic of Germany
- LACMA, Los Angeles County Museum, CA
