= 28th regime =

Proposed European Union legal framework

28th regimes (proposed terms: EU Inc., Societas Europaea Unificata (S.EU)) are proposed legal frameworks of European Union rules which do not replace member states' own national rules but are an optional alternative to them. The number 28 in the name comes from 27 member states in the EU and their national legal systems, which are extended by a new EU-wide alternative. In March 2026, the European Commission proposed the framework's first instrument: a harmonised EU legal form for companies, provisionally named "EU Inc.", with registration in 48 hours at a fee of up to €100 in simple cases, no required share capital, and a shared employee stock-option scheme. The Council of the European Union adopted its negotiating mandate on the proposal on 23 October 2026.

== History ==
The idea of an optional pan-European legal regime predates the 2026 initiative. In 2008 the European Commission proposed a statute for a European private company (SPE, COM(2008) 396), intended to let founders incorporate a single private company recognised across the EU; the proposal stalled in the Council, largely over employee participation rules, and was withdrawn on 30 April 2014. The European Economic and Social Committee had endorsed the concept of an alternative "28th regime" allowing less lawmaking at Community level in its 2011 own-initiative opinion.

Reports by Enrico Letta (2024) and Mario Draghi (2024) on the fragmentation of the single market revived the idea in 2024–2025. In January 2025 the President of the European Commission Ursula von der Leyen established a project group to work on proposals of 28th regime for startups and scaleups. In July 2025, the European Commission launched a public consultation to gather views from all stakeholders. Titled "28th regime – a single harmonized set of rules for innovative companies throughout the EU", the consultation closed on 30 September 2025.

== Examples ==
1. Societas Europaea (European Company Statute);
2. proposed European contract law;
3. European insurance contract law;
4. a unitary patent;
5. Pan-European Personal Pension Product;
6. Union authorization under the Biocidal Products Directive.

== EU Inc. proposal (2026) ==
The Commission's proposal (COM(2026) 320 and 321, procedure 2026/0074(COD)) followed a European Parliament resolution of 20 January 2026 (492 votes in favour, 144 against, 28 abstentions), in which Parliament recommended the framework under the name Societas Europaea Unificata (S.EU) and rejected a legal basis under Article 352 TFEU in favour of Articles 50 and 114. It would allow companies to register under the new legal form across the single market within two working days, with an optional five-working-day procedure for more complex cases at a fee not exceeding the cost of the service. The registered office and central administration would have to be in the Union, and at least one director would have to reside in a member state. The employee stock-option scheme (EU-ESO) would be limited to companies with fewer than 750 employees and annual turnover not exceeding €150 million.

The Commission's proposal envisaged application 12 months after entry into force. The Council's negotiating mandate extended this to 21 months. Three compromise texts prepared by the Irish Council presidency led to the negotiating mandate adopted by Coreper on 23 October 2026, which added grounds for refusing registration on anti-money-laundering grounds, a provision against wholly artificial arrangements, and removal of a central EU-wide register. The Dutch government supported the optional legal form while raising concerns about safeguards against abuse and the limited scope of harmonisation, and the European Parliamentary Research Service noted the risk of new fragmentation and legal uncertainty. The political aim is an agreement by the end of 2026.

The choice of name has itself been contested: "EU Inc." was criticised as an Americanism in a language row reported in January 2026, while Parliament's preferred "Societas Europaea Unificata" (S.EU) appears in the January 2026 resolution; the Commission's formal proposal and the Council's mandate both use "EU Inc.", and the final name will only be settled when the regulation is adopted.
