= Clayton Heights Secondary School =

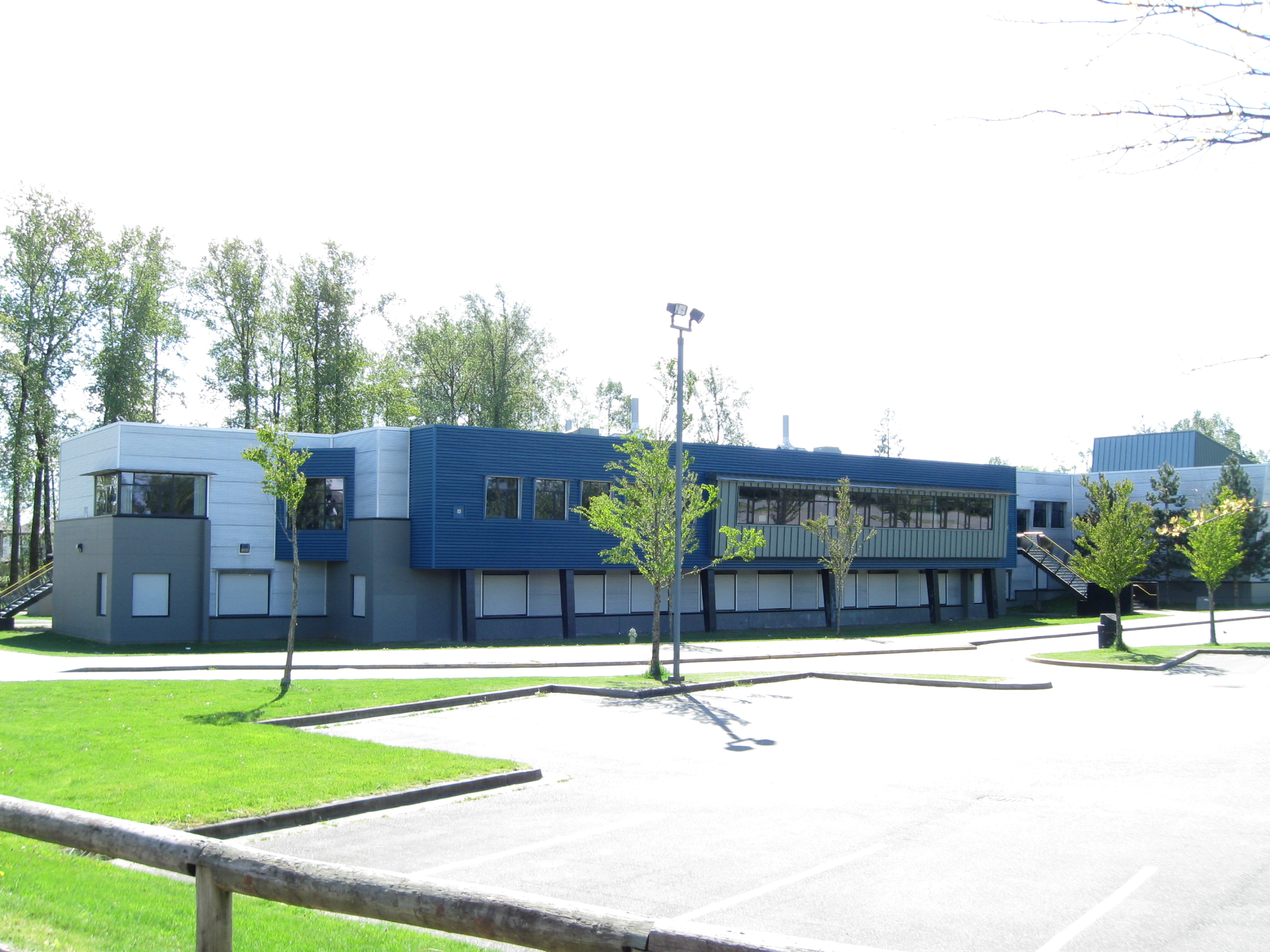

Location
- 7003 188 St; Surrey, British Columbia, V4N 3G6; Canada; 49.12894°N 122.70323°W

Information
- School type: Public, high school
- Founded: 1999
- School board: School District 36 Surrey
- School number: 3636175
- Principal: Mr. I. McGinnes
- Staff: 70
- Grades: 8-12
- Enrollment: ▲1365 (2025)
- Area: Clayton, Cloverdale, Surrey
- Colours: Black, Blue, Silver, Red
- Mascot: Nightmare
- Team name: The Riders
- Feeder schools: Sunrise Ridge Elementary, Latimer Road Elementary, Katzie Elementary and Hazelgrove Elementary
- Website: www.sd36.bc.ca/sites/clyhts/

Clayton Heights Secondary is a public high school in Surrey, British Columbia and is a part of School District 36 Surrey.

== Location ==
The school is set back on the west side of 188th St. The closest major intersection is 188th St. and Fraser Highway.

== History and facilities ==
Clayton Heights opened in 1999 with 1,000 students enrolled. The school was the first school to be built with the new Industrial/Concrete design, the others being Sullivan Heights, Fraser Heights, Kwantlen Park and Panorama Ridge.

Clayton Heights is one of the smallest high schools in Surrey due to the proximity of Lord Tweedsmuir Secondary School which is approximately five kilometers away. The school was built to accommodate the growing population in Cloverdale. The school's enrollment has increased significantly and as of 2018 it was 400 students over a capacity until the opening Salish Secondary School which eased off the overcrowding at the school. For the 2024/25 year there are 1375 students enrolled.

== Evaluation ==
For the academic school year of 2007-2008, Clayton Heights Secondary School received a ranking of 98 out of a possible 313, based upon the number of secondary schools in the Greater Vancouver Regional District. On a 1 to 10 scale, the school received a 7.1, rising from a 6.8 standing over the last five academic school years.

== Athletic Achievements ==
- 2022 AA Tier II Senior Boys Rugby Provincial Champions

== In popular culture ==
In 2003 and 2004, the motion picture Saved! was filmed on location at Clayton Heights. The movie was filmed during the school year, and during school hours, many students were used as extras. In the main hallway there is a plaque signed by the director and cast.

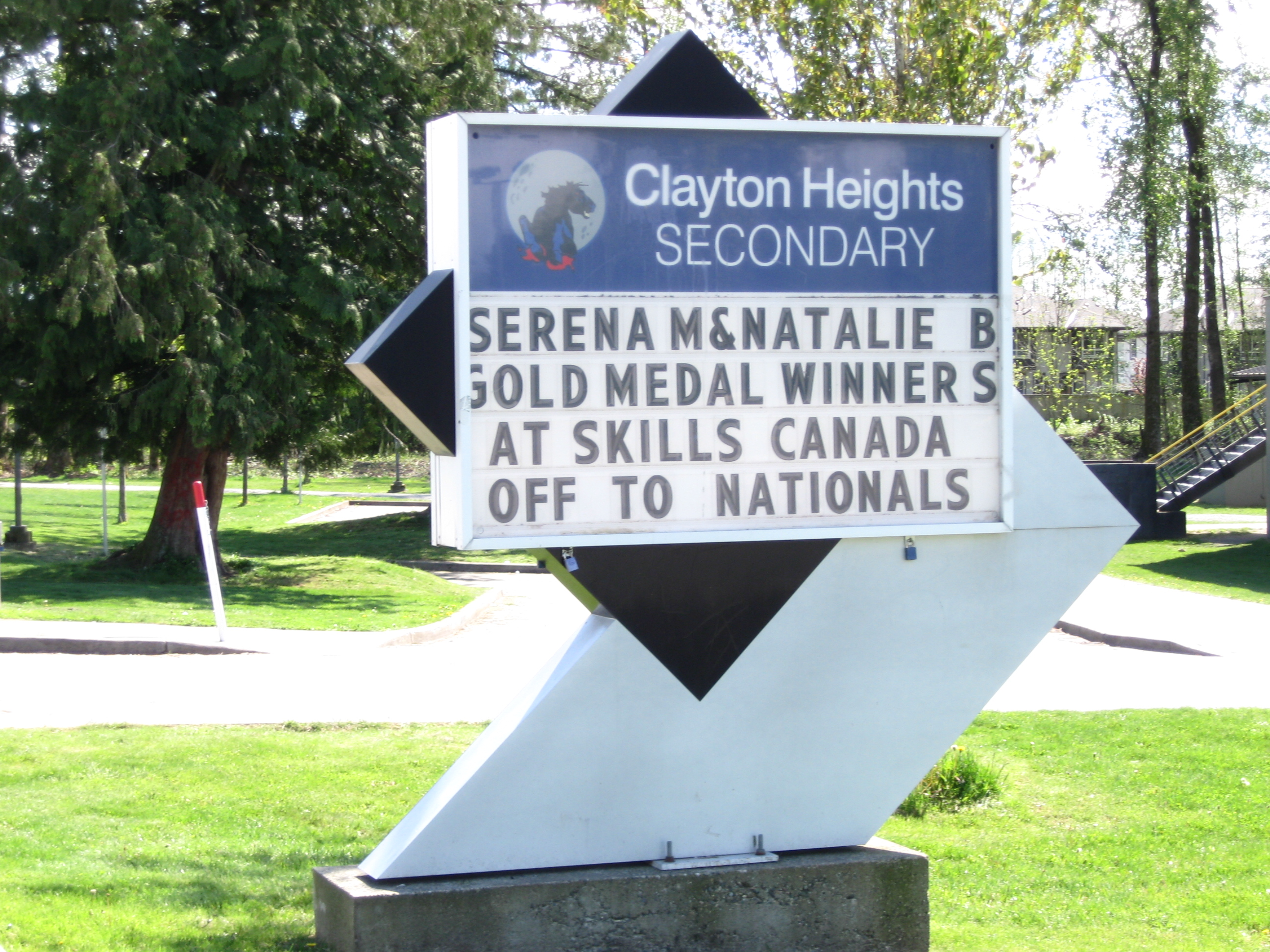
Clayton Heights' school noticeboard.

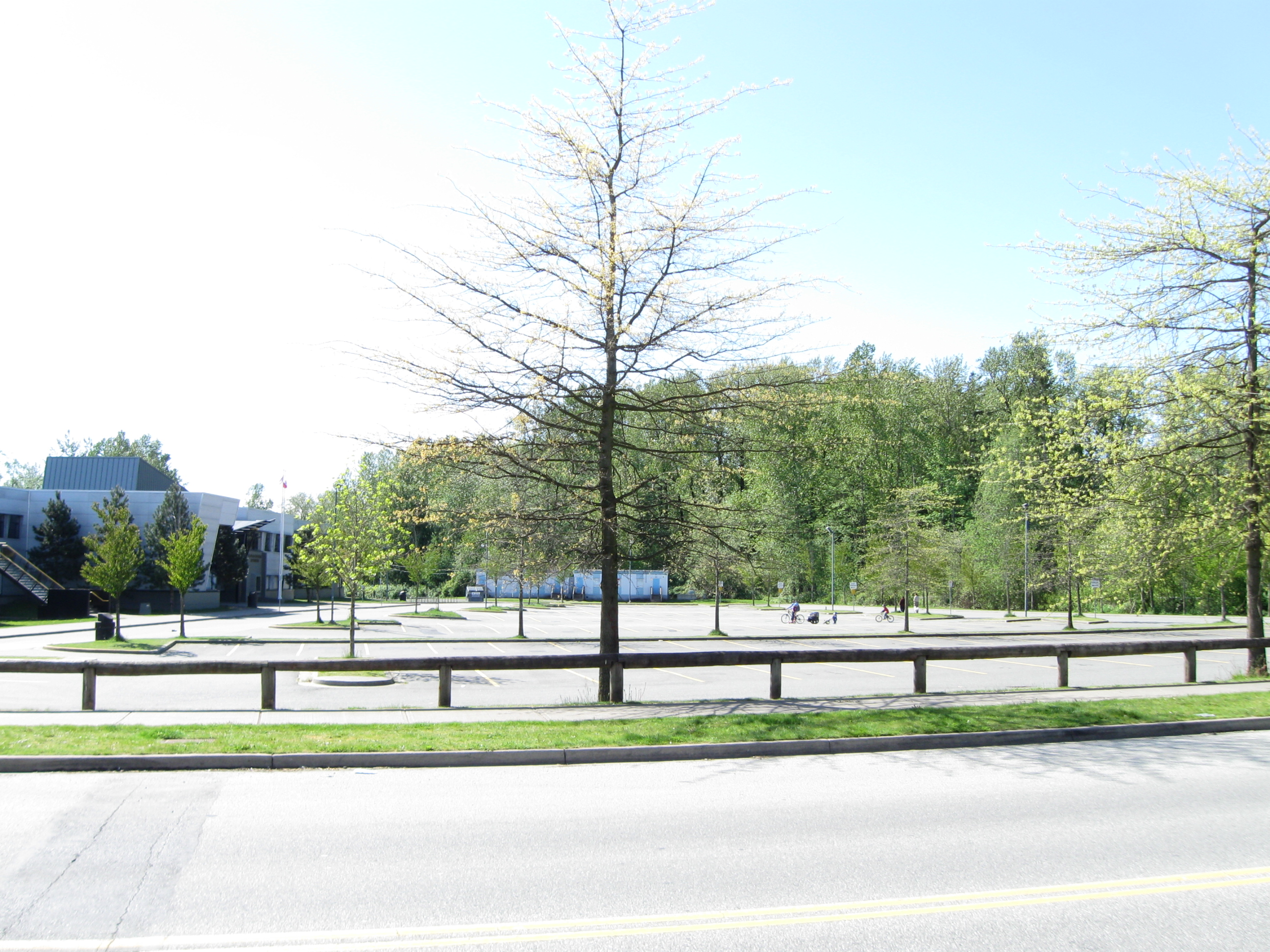
Parking at Clayton Heights school.
