= FHS =

FHS may refer to:

== Schools ==
=== United States ===
- Falmouth High School, Maine
- Farmington High School, Utah
- Fife High School, Fife, Washington
- Firestone High School, Akron, Ohio
- Flushing High School, Queens, New York
- Forks High School, Washington
- Framingham High School, Massachusetts
- Franklin High School, several schools
- Fremd High School, Palatine, Illinois
- Frenship High School, Wolfforth, Texas
- Frontier High School, Bakersfield, California
- Frontier High School, New Matamoras, Ohio
- Folsom High School, Folsom, California

=== Canada ===
- Frank Hurt Secondary School, Surrey, British Columbia
- Fredericton High School, New Brunswick

== Health and medicine ==
- Feline hyperesthesia syndrome
- Fetal hydantoin syndrome
- Floating–Harbor syndrome

== Other uses ==
- Fellow of the Horticultural Society
- Filesystem Hierarchy Standard
- Hasselt railway station, in Belgium
- Front handspring
- Frankfurter Hauptschule
