= School District 36 Surrey =

School district in British Columbia, Canada

Location
- Surrey Surrey, White Rock, Barnston Island in Metro/Coast Canada

District information
- Superintendent: Mark Pearmain
- Schools: 124 (K-12)
- Budget: CA$1.053 billion

Students and staff
- Students: 80,208
- Teachers: 6,716

Other information
- Website: www.surreyschools.ca

School District 36 Surrey operates schools in Surrey, White Rock, and Barnston Island, British Columbia. It is the largest school district in British Columbia, with 80,208 students and 195+ languages represented during the 2022–23 school year. District 36 includes 103 elementary schools, 21 secondary schools, 5 learning centres, and 3 adult education centres. While the district was established in 1906, its first school opened in 1882. The district is Surrey’s largest employer with 12,540 employees including 6,716 teachers.

== Administration ==
The Surrey School District's administration hub is the District Education Centre, which was officially opened on September 11, 2011.

== Schools ==
=== Elementary schools ===
School	Location	Grades	Notes
Adams Road Elementary School	Cloverdale	K-7	
A.H.P. Matthew Elementary School	Whalley	K-7	
A.J. McLellan Elementary School	Cloverdale	K-7	
Bayridge Elementary School	South Surrey	K-7	
Bear Creek Elementary School	Newton	K-7	
Beaver Creek Elementary School	Newton	K-7	Punjabi Language
Berkshire Park Elementary School	Fleetwood	K-7	
Betty Huff Elementary School	Whalley	K-7	
Bonaccord Elementary School	Guildford	K-7	
Bothwell Elementary School	Fraser Heights	K-7	
Boundary Park Elementary School	Newton	K-7	
Bridgeview Elementary School	Bridgeview	K-7	
Brookside Elementary School	Newton	K-7	
Cambridge Elementary School	Newton	K-7	
Cedar Hills Elementary School	Whalley	K-7	
Chantrell Creek Elementary School	Crescent Park	K-7	
Chimney Hill Elementary School	Newton	K-7	Punjabi Language
Cindrich Elementary School	Whalley	K-7	
Clayton Heights Elementary School	Clayton	4–7	
Cloverdale Traditional School	Cloverdale	K-7	
Coast Meridian Elementary School	Fleetwood	K-7	Intensive French
Colebrook Elementary School	Newton	K-7	
Cougar Creek Elementary School	Newton	K-7	
Coyote Creek Elementary School	Newton	K-7	
Creekside Elementary School	Whalley	K-7	
Crescent Park Elementary School	Crescent Park	K-7	Late French Immersion
David Brankin Elementary School	Whalley	K-7	Intensive Fine Arts program
Dogwood Elementary School	Fraser Heights	K-7	
Don Christian Elementary School	Cloverdale	K-7	
Douglas Elementary School	South Surrey	K-7	Montessori
Dr. F.D. Sinclair Elementary School	Newton	K-7	
Edgewood Elementary School	South Surrey	K-7	
East Clayton Elementary School	Clayton	K-3	
East Kensington Elementary School	South Surrey	K-7	Outdoor Learning
Ellendale Elementary School	Guildford	K-7	
Erma Stephenson Elementary School	Fraser Heights	K-7	Intensive French
Fleetwood Elementary School	Fleetwood	K-7	
Forsyth Road Elementary School	Whalley	K-7	
Fraser Wood Elementary School	Fraser Heights	K-7	Intensive French
Frost Road Elementary School	Fleetwood	K-7	Intensive French
George Greenaway Elementary School	Cloverdale	K-7	
Georges Vanier Elementary	Newton	K-7	
Goldstone Park Elementary	Newton	K-7	
Green Timbers Elementary School	Fleetwood	K-7	Punjabi Language
H.T. Thrift Elementary School	South Surrey	K-7	
Halls Prairie Elementary School	South Surrey	K-7	
Harold Bishop Elementary School	Guildford	K-7	
Hazelgrove Elementary School	Clayton	K-7	
Henry Bose Elementary School	Newton	K-7	Late French Immersion
Hillcrest Elementary School	Cloverdale	K-7	
Hjorth Road Elementary School	Guildford	K-7	
Holly Elementary	Guildford	K-7	
Hyland Elementary School	Newton	K-7	
J.T. Brown Elementary School	Newton	K-7	
James Ardiel Elementary School	Whalley	K-7	
Janice Churchill Elementary School	Newton	K-7	
Jessie Lee Elementary School	South Surrey	K-7	Late French Immersion
K.B. Woodward Elementary School	Whalley	K-7	Late French Immersion
Katzie Elementary School	Clayton	K-7	
Kennedy Trail Elementary School	Newton	K-7	
Kensington Prairie Elementary School	South Surrey	K-7	
Kirkbride Elementary School	Whalley	K-7	
Laronde Elementary School	Crescent Park	K-7	Early French Immersion
Latimer Road Elementary School	Cloverdale	K-7	Montessori
Lena Shaw Elementary School	Guildford	K-7	
M.B. Sanford Elementary School	Newton	K-7	
Maple Green Elementary School	Fleetwood	K-7	
Martha Currie Elementary School	Cloverdale	K-7	Early French Immersion
Martha Jane Norris Elementary School	Newton	K-7	
Mary Jane Shannon Elementary School	Guildford	K-7	
McLeod Road Traditional Elementary School	Newton	K-7	
Morgan Elementary School	South Surrey	K-7	
Mountainview Montessori School	Guildford	K-7	Montessori, Early French Immersion
Newton Elementary School	Newton	K-7	Punjabi Language
North Ridge Elementary School	Newton	K-7	
Ocean Cliff Elementary School	Crescent Park	K-7	Intensive French
Old Yale Road Elementary School	Whalley	K-7	
Pacific Heights Elementary School	South Surrey	K-7	Early French Immersion
Panorama Park Elementary School	South Newton / Panorama	K-7	
Peace Arch Elementary School	White Rock	K-7	Early French Immersion
Port Kells Elementary School	Port Kells	K-7	
Prince Charles Elementary School	Whalley	K-7	
Ray Shepherd Elementary School	South Surrey	K-7	
Riverdale Elementary School	Guildford	K-7	Early French Immersion
Rosemary Heights Elementary School	South Surrey	K-7	
Royal Heights Elementary School	Whalley	K-7	
Semiahmoo Trail Elementary School	South Surrey	K-7	
Senator Reid Elementary School	Whalley	K-7	
Serpentine Heights Elementary School	Guildford	K-7	
Simon Cunningham Elementary School	Whalley	K-7	Early French Immersion
Snokomish Elementary School	South Newton/Panorama	K-7	Early French Immersion
South Meridian Elementary School	South Surrey	K-7	
Strawberry Hill Elementary School	Newton	K-7	Punjabi Language
Sullivan Elementary School	Newton	K-7	
Sunnyside Elementary	South Surrey	K-7	
Sunrise Ridge Elementary School	Cloverdale	K-7	Late French Immersion
Surrey Centre Elementary School	Cloverdale	K-7	
Surrey Traditional School	Whalley	K-7	
T.E. Scott Elementary School	Newton	K-7	Punjabi Language
Theresa Clarke Elementary School	Whalley	K-7	
W.E. Kinvig Elementary School	Newton	K-7	
Walnut Road Elementary School	Fleetwood	K-7	
Westerman Elementary School	Newton	K-7	
White Rock Elementary School	White Rock	K-7	Intensive Fine Arts program
William F. Davidson Elementary School	Guildford	K-7	
William Watson Elementary School	Fleetwood	K-7	
Woodward Hill Elementary School	Newton	K-7	
Woodland Park Elementary School	Fleetwood	K-7	

=== Secondary schools and other programs ===
School	Location	Grades	Founded
Adolescent Psychiatric Unit Program	Surrey		
City Central Learning Centre	Surrey	10–12	
Clayton Heights Secondary School	Clayton	8–12	1999
Cloverdale Learning Centre	Cloverdale	10–12	
Continuing Ed SD 36 School	Surrey	11–12	
Daughters and Sisters (PLEA) Program	Surrey		
Earl Marriott Secondary School	South Surrey	8–12	1973
École Salish Secondary	Clayton	8–12	2018
Elgin Park Secondary School	South Surrey	8–12	1993
Enver Creek Secondary School	Fleetwood	8–12	1997
Fleetwood Park Secondary School	Fleetwood	8–12	1994
Frank Hurt Secondary School	Newton	8–12	1973
Fraser Heights Secondary School	Fraser Heights	8–12	2000
Grandview Heights Secondary School	South Surrey	8–12	2021
Guildford Learning Centre	Guildford	10–12	
Guildford Park Secondary School	Guildford	8–12	1984
Invergarry Learning Centre	Newton	10	
Johnston Heights Secondary School	Guildford	8–12	1958
Kwantlen Park Secondary School (Inter-A)	Whalley	8–12	2002
L.A. Matheson Secondary School	Whalley	8–12	1969
Lord Tweedsmuir Secondary School	Cloverdale	8–12	1946
North Surrey Learning Centre	Newton	10–12	
North Surrey Secondary School	Guildford	8–12	1947
Panorama Ridge Secondary School	Newton	8–12	2006
Princess Margaret Secondary School	Newton	8–12	1958
Queen Elizabeth Secondary School	Whalley	8–12	1940
Semiahmoo Secondary School	South Surrey	8–12	1940
South Fraser Adolescent Day Treatment Program	Surrey		
Southridge School	Surrey	K-12	1995
South Surrey White Rock Learning Centre	South Surrey	10–12	
Student Support Centre	Surrey	6–12	
Sullivan Heights Secondary	Newton	8–12	2000
Surrey Connect Online School	Surrey	K-12	
Surrey Academy of Innovative Learning	Whalley	8–10	2015
Tamanawis Secondary School	Newton	8–12	1994
TREES Centre	Surrey	8–10	
Waypoint Substance Abuse House	Surrey		

== Budget ==
For the first time in history, the Surrey Board of Education passed an annual budget totalling more than a billion dollars for the 2023–24 school year consisting of $602 million for teacher costs and $451 million for all other costs. The largest sources of funds are $945 million in provincial government grants, $17 million in tuition, $9 million in investment income, $4 million in rental and lease income, and $3 million in federal grants.

== In the news ==
The Surrey School District was reported in the national news numerous times during the 1990s and 2000s, most notably for its stand on social issues.

=== Overcrowding ===
Surrey had 361 portable classrooms in use by the end of the 2022–23 school year. This number had increased by 20% over the 15 years prior.

=== Book banning ===
The District School Board was the focus of major media attention from 1997 to 2002 over its stand on not allowing books about families with same-sex parents to be included as optional learning resources. These books were requested by James Chamberlain, a kindergarten teacher, to reflect on the realities of today's families and to teach his pupils about diversity and tolerance.

A legal battle to overturn the decision to ban the three books went all the way to the Supreme Court of Canada, where the school board's decision was overturned. The judgment, Chamberlain v. Surrey School District No. 36, cited the need for families headed by same-sex couples to be respected. Chief Justice Beverley McLachlin dismissed the Board's concerns that children would be confused or misled by classroom information about same-sex parents. She pointed out that the children of same-sex parents are rubbing shoulders with children from more traditional families, and wrote: "Tolerance is always age-appropriate, children cannot learn unless they are exposed to views that differ from those they are taught at home." The legal fees ended up costing Surrey taxpayers over $1,200,000.

=== Drama production ===
In 2005, the Surrey School District made national news for cancelling production of The Laramie Project, a play that deals with the murder of a gay university student, in Elgin Park Secondary. Advocates for the play noted that it is designed to teach tolerance toward LGBT people. The school district's administration said that the play contains sex, violence and foul language and is not appropriate as family entertainment. The decision met with outrage from LGBT advocacy organization Egale Canada. A school in neighbouring Vancouver, Lord Byng Secondary School, subsequently chose to stage the play.

=== Climate change ===
In May 2007, the Surrey School Board made national news when it voted to instruct teachers not to show Al Gore's Academy Award-winning documentary on climate change, An Inconvenient Truth, until trustees were able to review the film. On the issue of climate change, Board Trustee and social activist Heather Stilwell stated: "I am not sure. I mean I see evidence. I think there is climate change, there's no question about that. Whether what Al Gore says about it is the truth, I have questions."

=== Bible study ===
In early November 2009, a Cloverdale father, Paul Jubenvill, requested an extra-curricular, non-instructional, voluntarily-attended Bible club be established during lunch-hour at his sons' school, Colebrook Elementary. The school would not permit the club on their property, and the Surrey School District supported the school's position. The father argued that this ban violated the provincial BC Human Rights Code by disallowing a normally available service on the grounds of discrimination against religion. The school district was concerned that permitting the club may have given the appearance of the school endorsing a particular religious ideology. Jubenvill argued that there is a difference between endorsing a faith versus "accommodating" spiritual needs.

A complaint was filed with the BC Human Rights Tribunal; however, Jubenvill withdrew the complaint because he felt that the resulting media attention and the reaction it generated did not accurately represent his intentions and he preferred to address the matter with the school district out of the public eye.

Some secondary schools in the School District have, or have had, overtly Christian clubs (for example, LA Matheson has a prayer club titled "PUSH", Semiahmoo Secondary had a Crossroad Christian club in 2008 and earlier years, and Fraser Heights Secondary had a Bible Club in 2007).

=== Roof collapse ===
At Colebrook Elementary in July 2010, a 75-foot portion of a roof over an exterior walkway collapsed, with no injuries reported. In 2011 the school district initiated legal action against the contractor and architect involved in the design and construction of the roof, which had been built in 1987.

=== Anti-discrimination code ===
In November 2013 the School Board adopted an anti-discrimination code to provide protection for students and staff against homophobic and other forms of bullying. Approximately one third of all school districts in the province have policies against homophobic bullying.

== Gallery ==
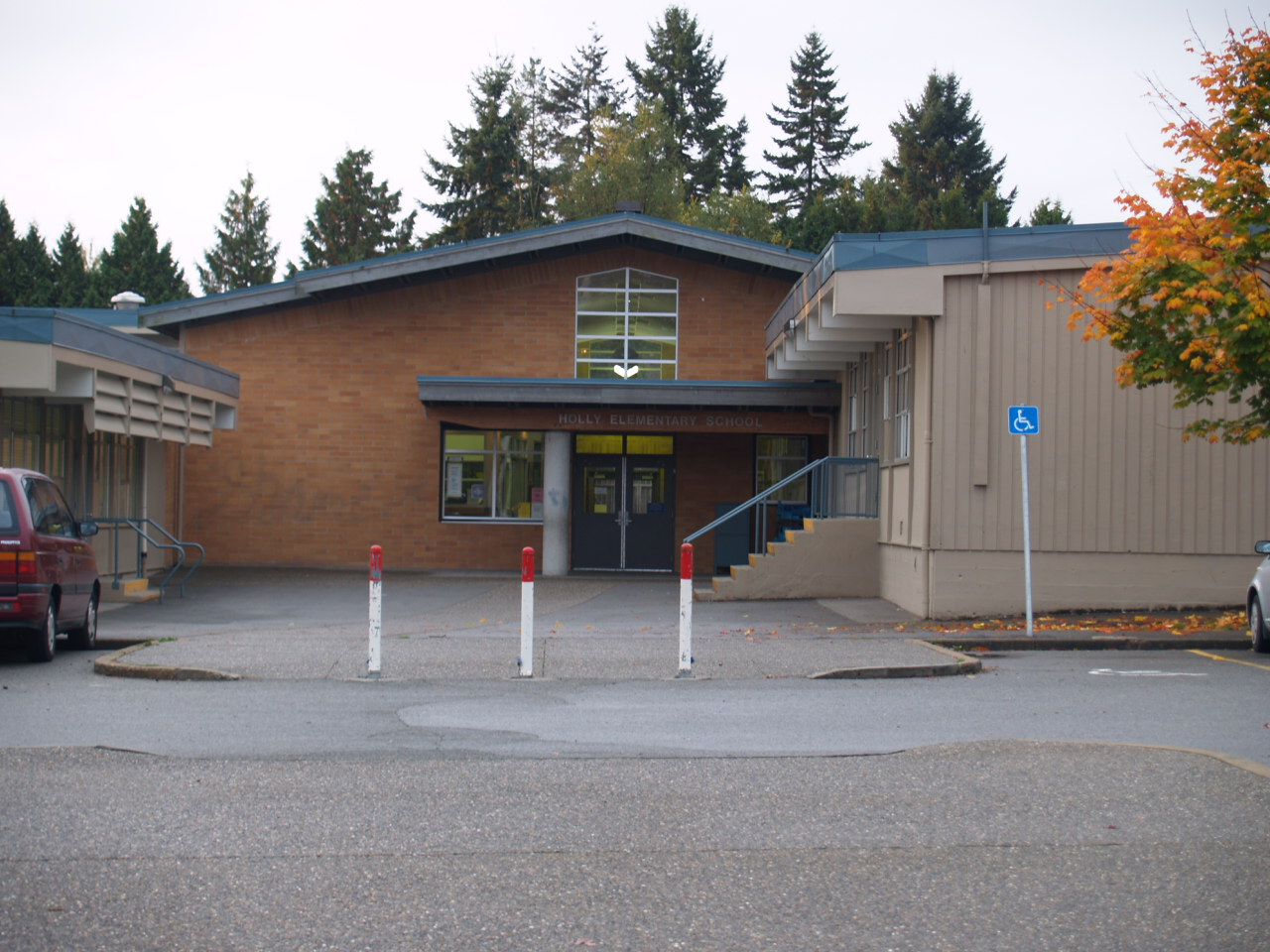
Holly Elementary School by day

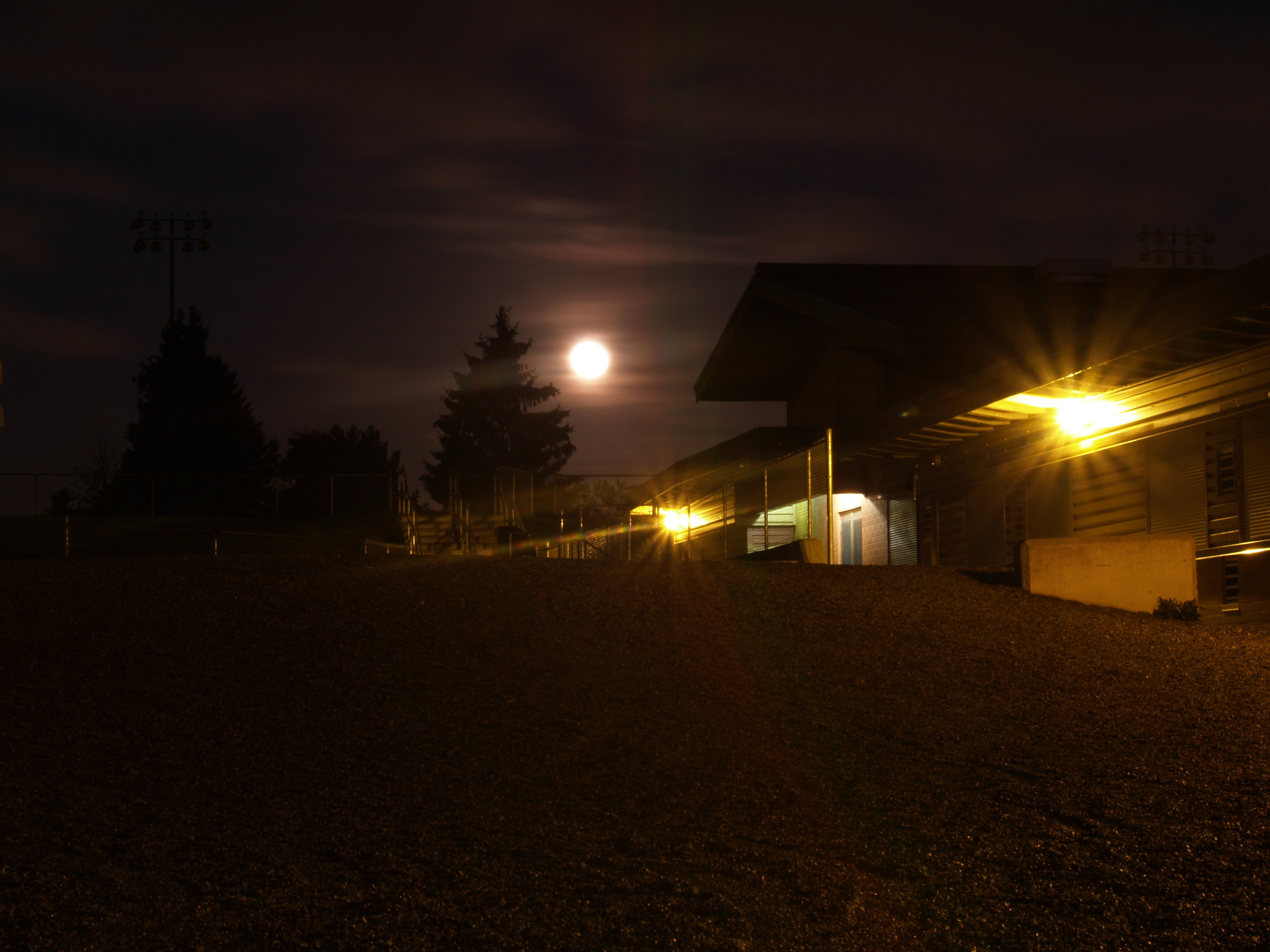
The moon sets over Holly Elementary School, October 14, 2008.

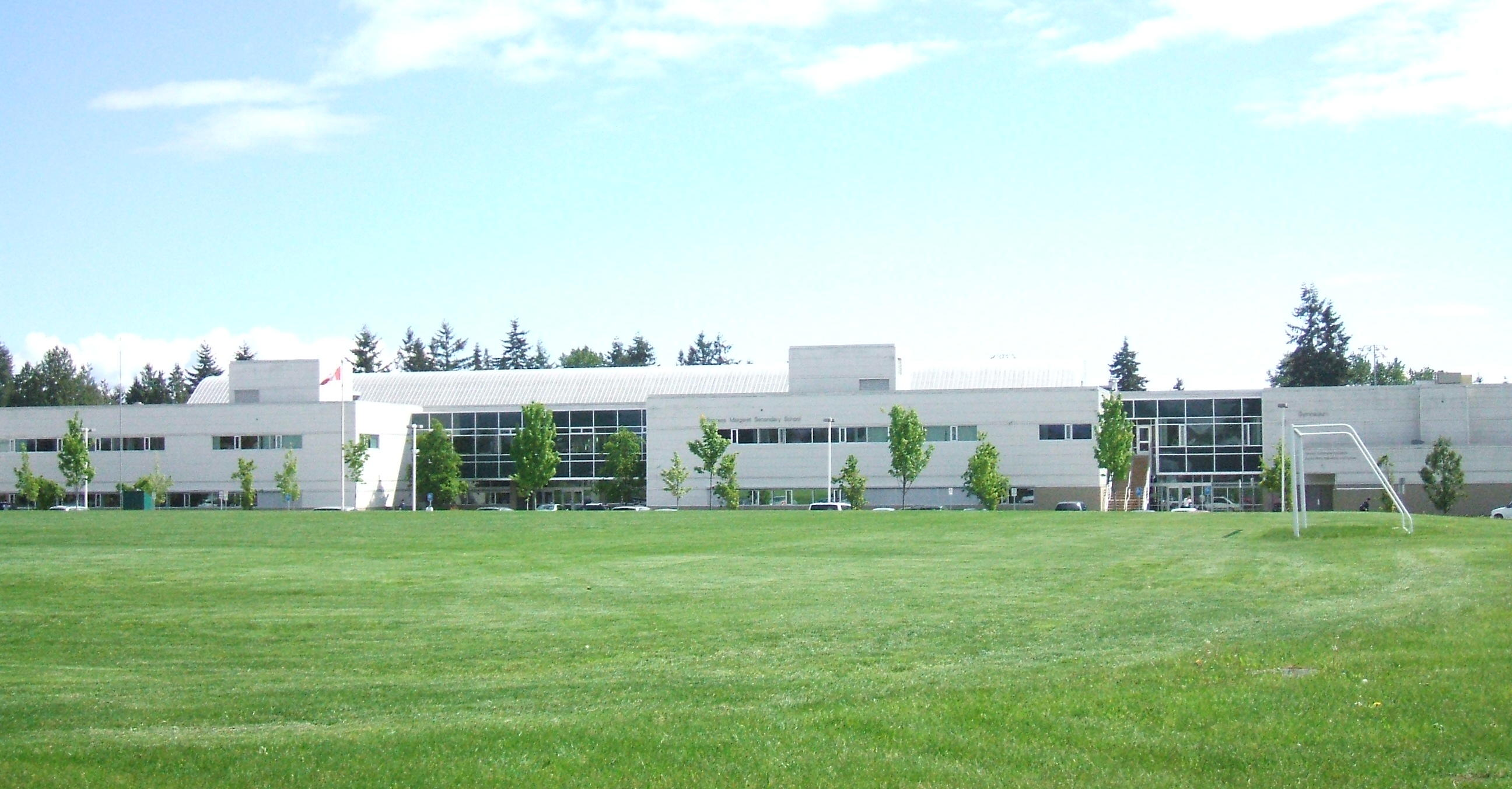
Princess Margaret Secondary School

Colebrook Elementary School; evening shot of the south wing in October 2009

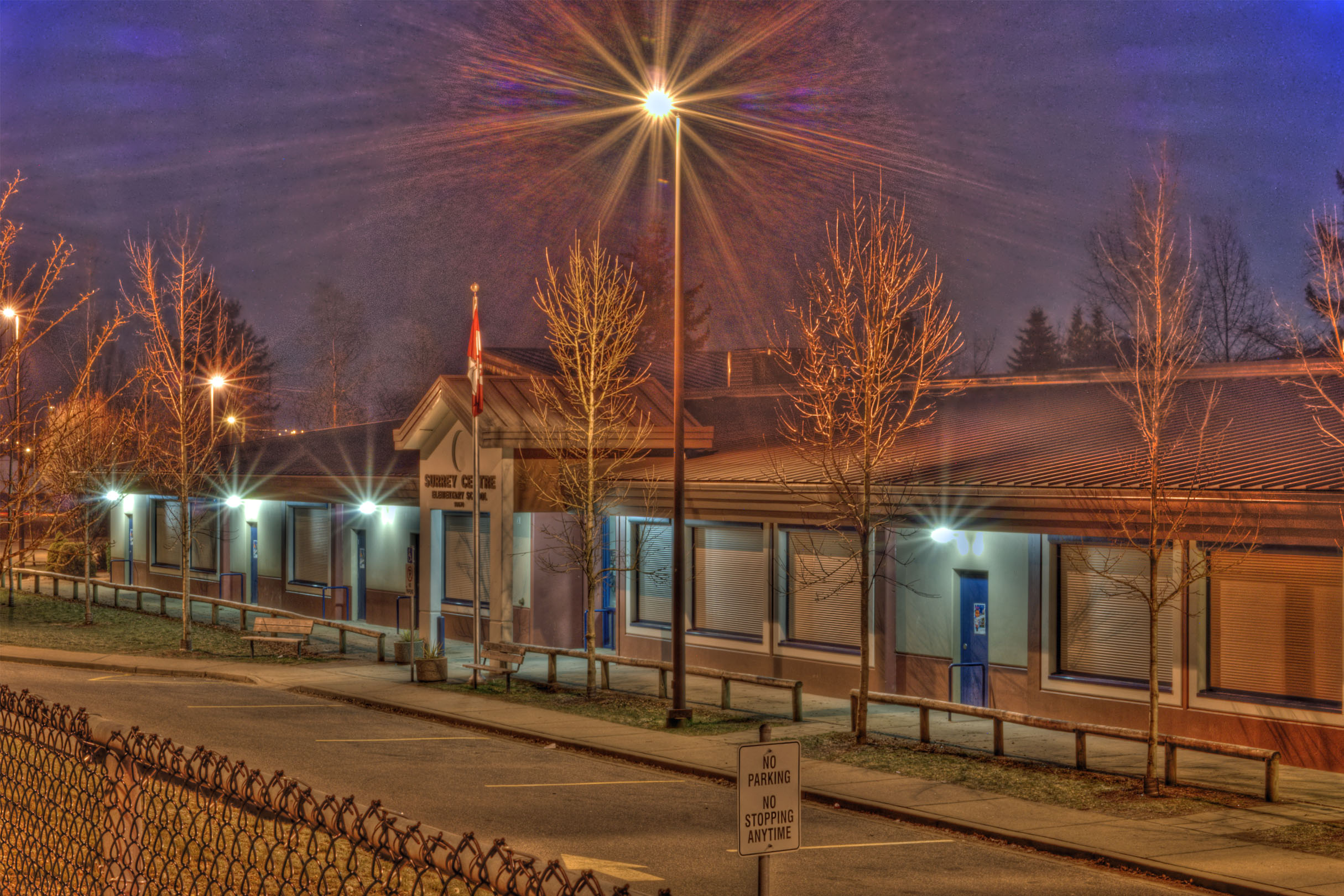
Surrey Centre Elementary School; Dec 2, 2009 (full moon) HDR shot at 11:10 pm

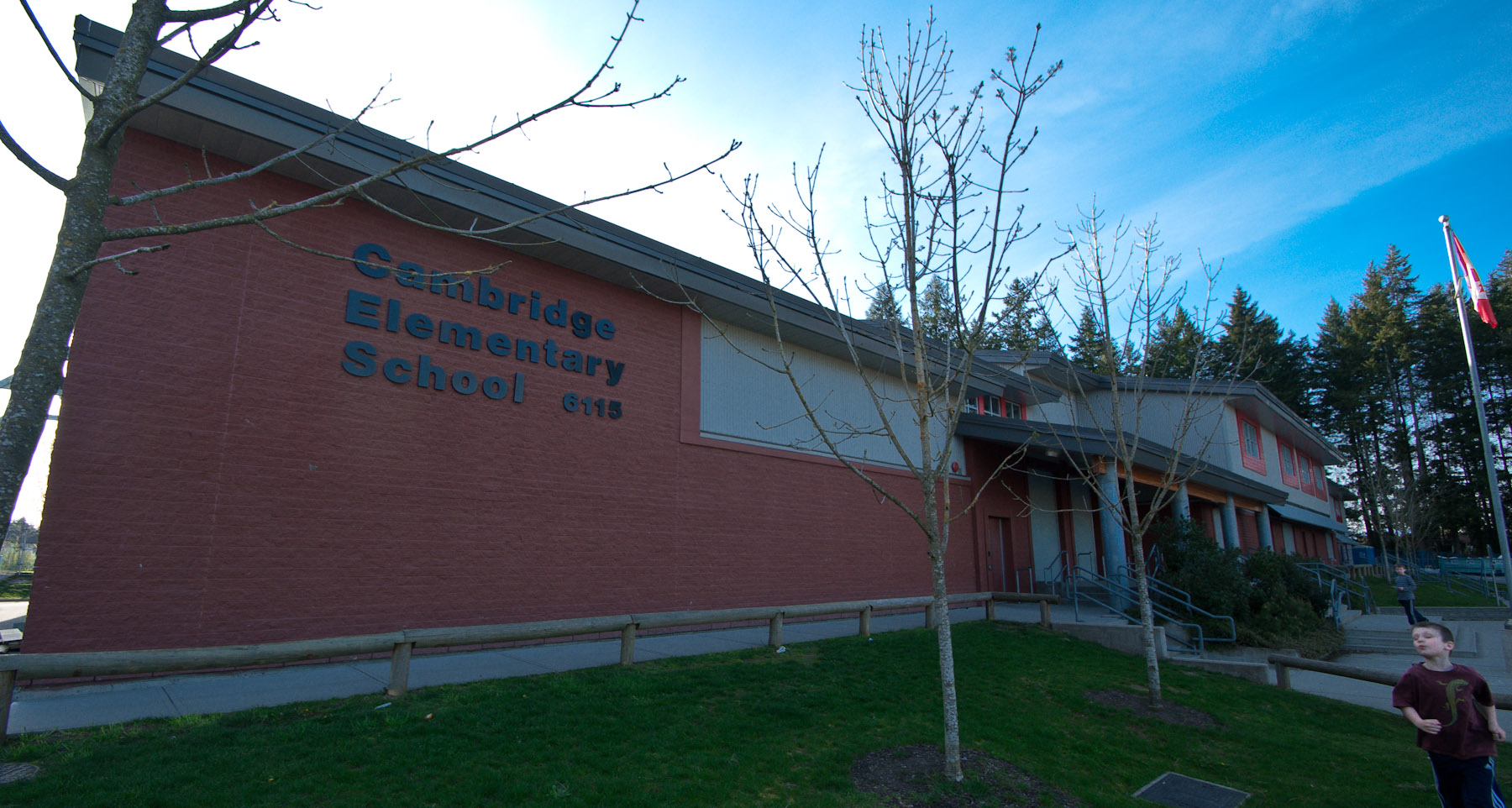
Cambridge Elementary School; May 1, 2011

== See also ==
- List of school districts in British Columbia
- Royal eponyms in Canada—locales in Canada named for royalty akin to Prince Charles Elementary School in District 36
