= Barnston Island =

Island in the Fraser River

- Location of Barnston Island in Metro Vancouver

Geography
- Coordinates: 49°11′38″N 122°42′20″W

Demographics
- Population: 155 (2001)

Additional information
- Time zone: BC Pacific Time (UTC−07:00)
- Forward sortation area: V4N
- Area codes: 604, 778, 236, 672

Barnston Island is an unincorporated island located in the Greater Vancouver metropolitan area of British Columbia, Canada. Most of it is part of Metro Vancouver Electoral Area A; the remainder is Barnston Island Indian Reserve No. 3, which is outside Electoral Area A limits and under the governance of the Katzie First Nation, headquartered across the river at their main reserve in Pitt Meadows. Although the island is unincorporated and not officially part of any municipality, mailing addresses on the island use Surrey as the city name.

Located in the Fraser River between Surrey and Pitt Meadows, Barnston Island was named in 1827 for Hudson's Bay Company Clerk George Barnston. The island has no direct road access to the rest of the area. It is accessed through the Barnston Island Ferry, a 5-minute ferry passage from Surrey on 104 Avenue across Parson's Channel; the ferry ride is free. Barnston Island's main road travels along the perimeter of the island.

Barnston Island contains mostly farmland and is home to 155 people (2001 census), 46 of whom live on the Barnston Island 3 Indian Reserve, near the southeast part of the island. Statistics Canada defines the island as Vancouver CMA Census Tract 0251.00 of British Columbia.

== History ==
The island was named for George Barnston, a Hudson's Bay Company clerk, who travelled with Chief Factor James McMillan to found Fort Langley in 1827.

Barnston Island first received electricity in 1938, following the laying of an underwater cable between Port Kells and the south side of the island.

In 2004, a group of landowners applied to the provincial Agricultural Land Commission to have approximately 85% of the land outside the Indigenous community removed from the Agricultural Land Reserve. On July 19, 2006 the Commission rejected the application.

== Infrastructure ==
Barnston Island is home to several local companies, including Barnston Island Herbs, Painted River Farm, and Avalon Dairy. It was formerly the home of Apollo Cranberries before it defaulted in 2015, with its 200 acre cranferry bog operation eventually being sold to D.R. Barnston Holdings Ltd.

There are no schools on Barnston Island. K-12 education for its residents is provided by School District 36 Surrey. Students are zoned to Bothwell Elementary and Fraser Heights Secondary School.

== Demographics (Barnston Island Indian Reserve No. 3) ==
In the 2011 Census, Statistics Canada originally reported that Barnston Island 3 had a population of 0 living in 1 of its 1 total dwellings, a -100.0% change from its 2006 population of 49. Statistics Canada subsequently amended the 2011 census results to a population of 47 living in 18 of its 18 total dwellings, a -4.3% change from 2006. With a land area of 0.58 km^{2} (0.22 sq mi), it had a population density of 81.0/km^{2} (209.9/sq mi) in 2011.

Canada 2006 Census
Ethnicity		Population	% of total population
Indigenous	First Nations	35	70%
Indigenous	Métis	0	0%
Indigenous	Inuit	0	0%
Total Indigenous population		35	70%
White		15	30%
Total population		50	100%

== See also ==
- Metro Vancouver Electoral Area A
- James McMillan (fur trader)
