= École Salish Secondary School =

High school in Surrey, British Columbia

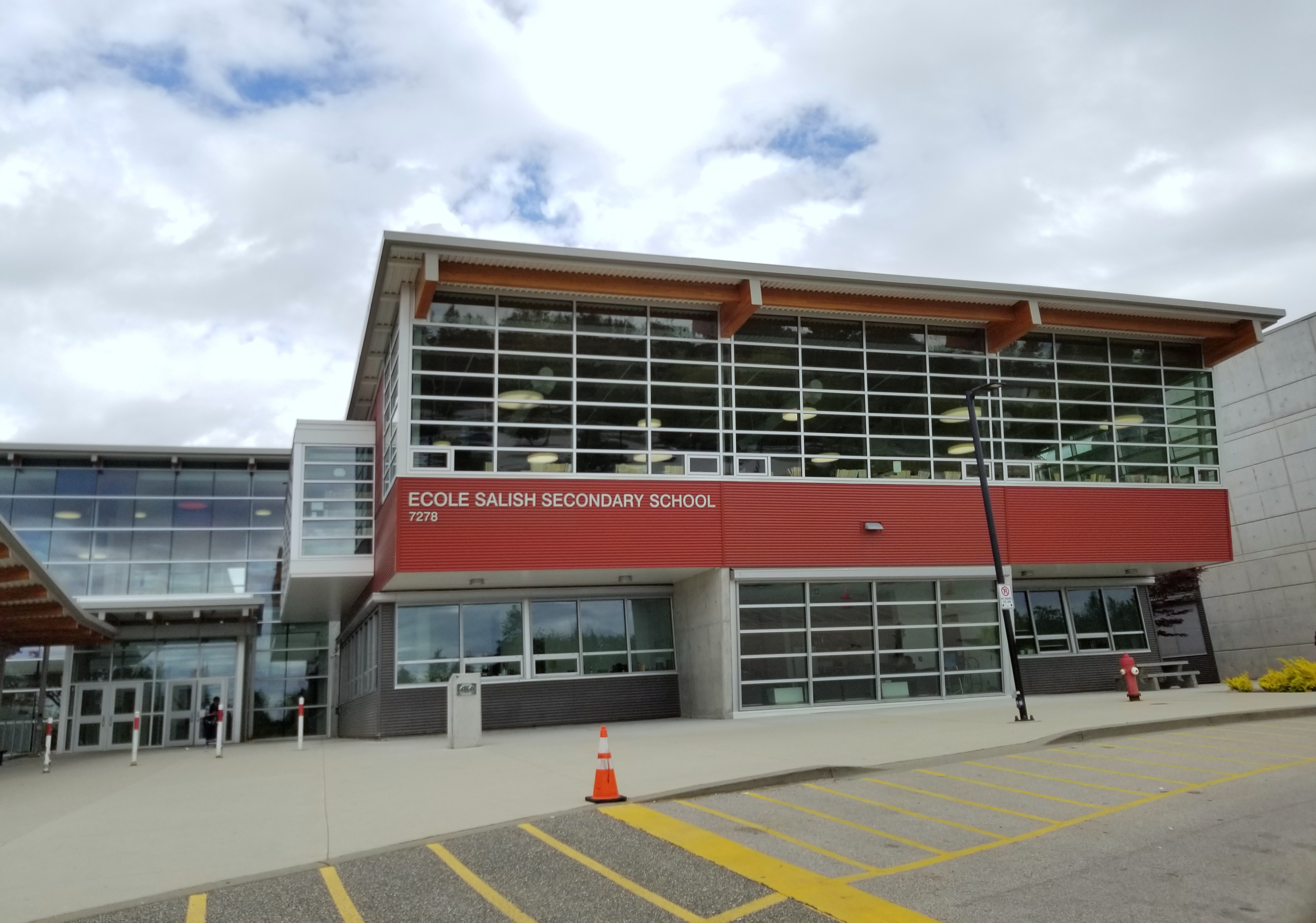

Location
- 7278 184 Street; Cloverdale, Surrey, British Columbia, V4N 5V2; Canada; 49.1354°N 122.7104°W

Information
- School type: Public, high school
- Founded: 2018
- School board: School District 36 Surrey
- School number: 03636215
- Principal: Michael Haffner
- Grades: 8-12
- Enrolment: ▲1,597 (2025)
- Language: English, French
- Colours: Black, Blue, White, Red
- Team name: Wolves
- Website: www.surreyschools.ca/schools/salish

École Salish Secondary School is a public high school in Surrey, British Columbia, and part of Surrey’s School District 36.

The school's mascot is a wolf and the name of their basketball team, the Salish Wolves. They are rivals with the Lord Tweedsmuir Panthers from Lord Tweedsmuir Secondary School.

== History ==
Construction of École Salish Secondary began in late 2016 and was completed in 2018, with École Salish Secondary opening in September 2018. It was named after the local Coast Salish peoples who are indigenous to the area.

The first students who came to the school were mostly former students from Lord Tweedsmuir Secondary and Clayton Heights Secondary. The first principal, Sheila Hammond, was also the former principal of Johnston Heights Secondary School. As of June 2019, it was the Surrey School District's least-crowded secondary school, and currently has around 2000 students.

== Programs and classes ==
The school is one of the four secondary schools in the Surrey school district to offer French immersion.

== Athletic achievements ==
- In 2022, the school won the AA Tier II award for the Senior Girls Rugby Provincial Champions.
- In 2026, the Girls Rugby team won the South Fraser Champions, Seniors Girls 7's Rugby 2025/26. They are scheduled to attend Provincials on May 28 and 29, 2026.
