= Guildford Park Secondary School =

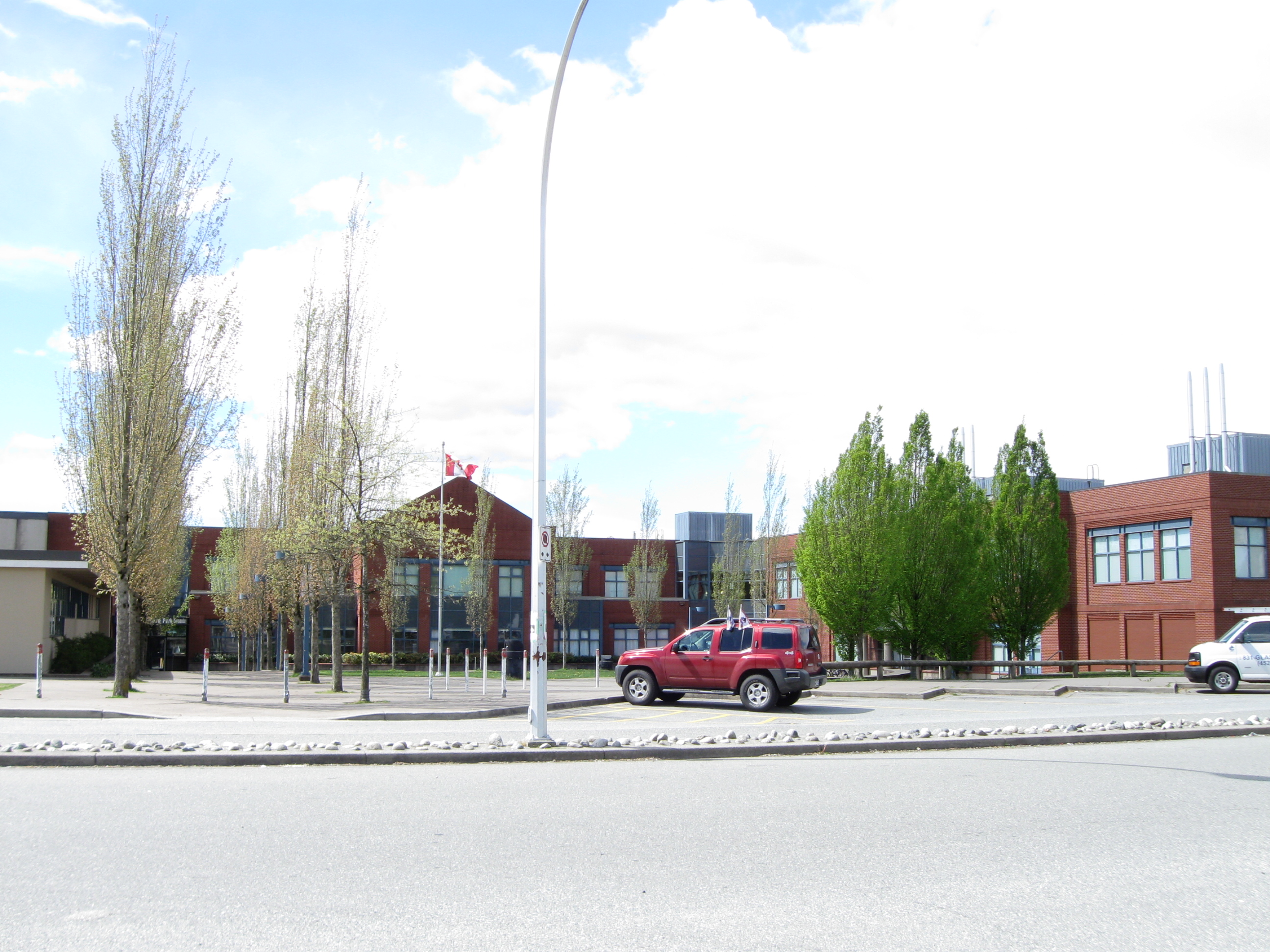

Location
- 10707 146 Street; Surrey, British Columbia, V3R 1T5; Canada; 49.1972°N 122.8189°W

Information
- School type: Public, high school
- Motto: Everyone Matters
- Founded: 1984
- School board: School District 36 Surrey
- School number: 3636047
- Principal: Marti Player
- Staff: 134
- Grades: 8-12
- Enrolment: ▼1,421 (2025)
- Language: English
- Colours: Green, White, Dark Green, Grey
- Mascot: Sabre
- Team name: Sabres
- Website: www.surreyschools.ca/guildfordpark

Guildford Park Secondary School is a grade 8 through 12 secondary school in Surrey, British Columbia. It is located just west of the Port Mann Bridge and Guildford Town Centre, in a suburban inner-city community close to Holly Park. The school has over 1400 students from all over the world that speak more than 70 different languages.

== Clubs ==
Guildford Park Secondary School offers more than 20 clubs, including Garden Club, Art Club, Chess Club, Reading Club, Mars Club (science club) and more.

== Programs ==
=== After School Tutoring ===
Guildford Park Secondary School has an after-school tutoring program that is free for the students. Students can receive tutoring on Tuesday, Wednesday, or Thursday between 2:45 and 4:15 pm in the library. Senior Students can also apply to be tutors and help other students. Students who are tutors are paid for their help and receive their payment in a scholarship at the end of the year.

=== Aboriginal Student Support ===
Guildford Park Secondary has an Aboriginal Student Support Team which includes an Aboriginal Support Teacher, two Aboriginal Youth Care Workers, a Counsellor, and a Vice-Principal. The team provides academic, emotional-social, and cultural support for Aboriginal students. The office is located in the main school foyer and students can connect with members of the team at the office throughout the school day.

== Extra-Curriculars ==
=== Athletics ===
The Athletics Department at Guildford Park provides students with opportunities to represent the school in multiple sport activities. Guildford Park participates in the following extra-curricular sports: Soccer, Freestyle Wrestling, Volleyball, Rugby, Basketball, Badminton, Ultimate Frisbee, Ball Hockey, and Ice Hockey. The Guildford Park wrestling team has won provincial high-school championships in 2004, 2008, and 2009 and has consistently finished as part of top ten every year. The Guildford Park ice hockey team won the division championship for Surrey High School Hockey League in 2014.

==== Spring ====
- Badminton
- Track and field
- Junior Girls´ Soccer
- Senior Girls´ Soccer
- Grade 8 Boys´ Rugby
- Junior Boys´ Rugby
- Senior Boys´ Rugby
- Senior Girls´ Rugby
- Ultimate

==== Fall ====
- Junior Boys´ Soccer
- Senior Boys´ Soccer
- Grade 8 Girls´ Volleyball
- Grade 8 Boys´ Volleyball
- Junior Girls´ Volleyball
- Junior Boys´ Volleyball
- Senior Boys´ Volleyball
- Senior Girls´ Volleyball
- Cross-Country

==== Winter ====
- Wrestling
- Hockey
- GP Dance Team
- Grade 8 Boys´ Basketball
- Grade 8 Girls´ Basketball
- Junior Boys´ Basketball
- Junior Girls´ Basketball
- Senior Girls´ Basketball
- Senior Boys' Basketball
