= Mountainview Montessori School =

Mountainview Montessori

Location
- 15225 98 Ave; Surrey, British Columbia, V3R 1J2; Canada
- Coordinates: 49.1810°N 122.7994°W

Information
- School type: Public, Elementary school
- Motto: See 2 C's (Care for living things, care for non living things)
- School board: School District 36 Surrey
- School number: 3636050
- Principal: Jennifer Snow
- Grades: K-7
- Enrollment: 328 (4 May 2014)
- Language: English
- Colours: Navy and gold
- Mascot: Mustang
- Team name: Mountainview Mustangs
- Website: www.sd36.bc.ca/directory/schooldetail.asp?type=e&type2=t&snum=50
- Last updated: April 29, 2017

Mountainview Montessori is a public elementary school in Surrey, British Columbia part of School District 36 Surrey. It is the only publicly funded "single track" Montessori programme in Surrey. It was originally established at the historic Tynehead Elementary School in 1990 and moved to the new site and renamed "Mountainview" in 2004.
