= South Surrey White Rock Learning Centre =

Location
- 13-2320 King George Hwy; Surrey, British Columbia, V4A 5A5; Canada
- Coordinates: 49.04503°N 122.79057°W

Information
- School type: Public, high school
- School board: School District 36 Surrey
- School number: 604-536-0550
- Principal: Janice Smith
- Staff: 18
- Grades: 10-12
- Enrollment: 180 (30 September 2021)
- Last updated: November 19, 2021

South Surrey White Rock Learning Centre is a public, co-educational secondary school located in Surrey, British Columbia, Canada. The school is a part of School District 36 Surrey and educates students from grades 10 to 12.
