= Johnston Heights Secondary School =

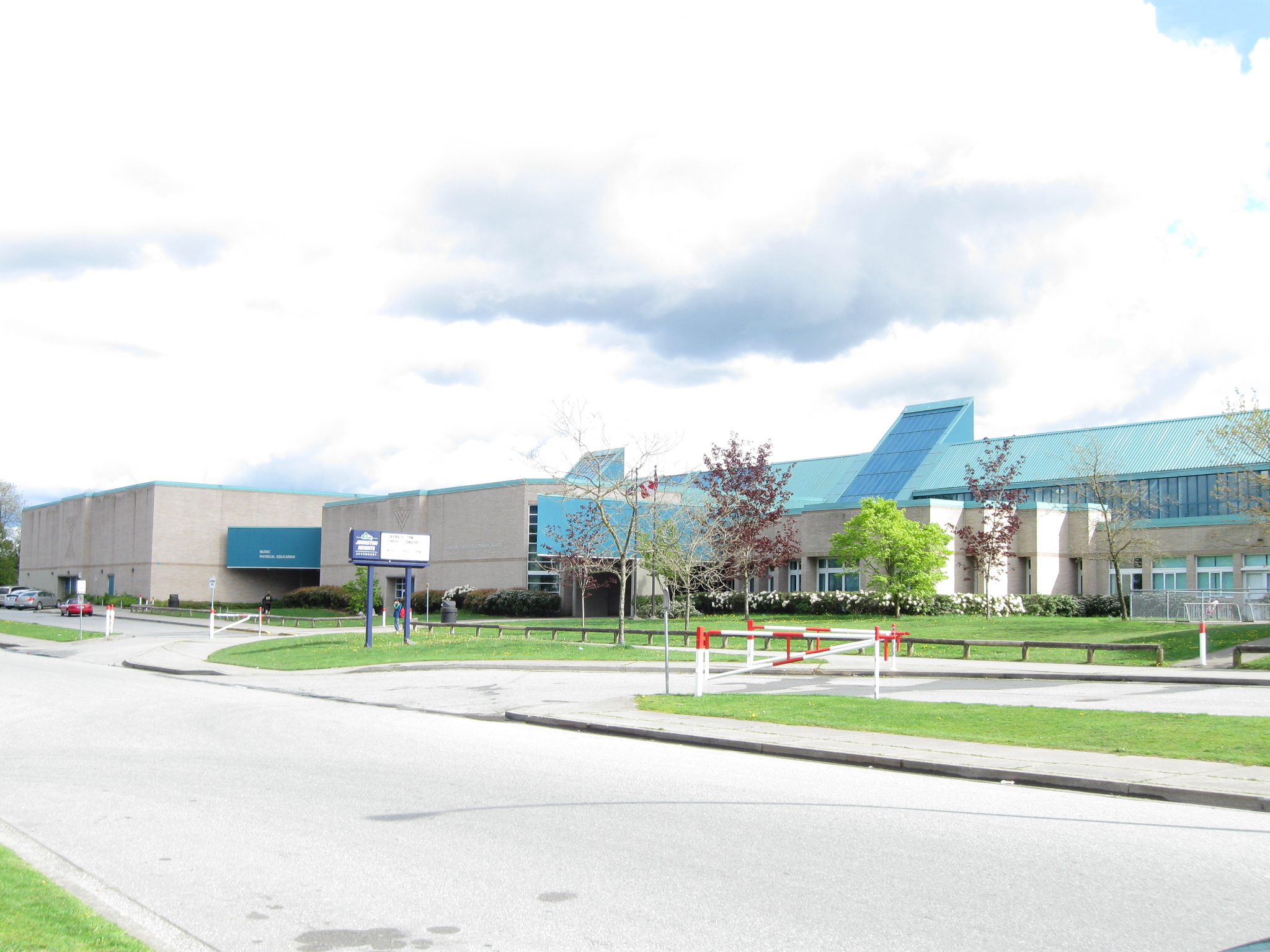

Location
- 15350 99 Avenue; Surrey, British Columbia, V3R 0R9; Canada; 49°12′N 122°48′W

Information
- School type: Public, Secondary
- Motto: Home of the Eagles, Eagles Do Succeed
- School board: School District 36 Surrey
- School number: 3636045
- Principal: Courtney O'Brien
- Staff: 120
- Grades: 8–12
- Enrolment: ▼1,523 (2025)
- Language: English
- Area: Guildford
- Colours: white, green, blue
- Mascot: Wing Wing, an Eagle
- Team name: JH Eagles
- Feeder schools: William F. Davidson, Berkshire Park, Bonaccord, Mountainview Montessori, Fleetwood, Harold Bishop
- Website: www.surreyschools.ca/johnht/

Johnston Heights Secondary is a public high school in Surrey, British Columbia, and is part of School District 36 Surrey.

The newest building opened in the Fall of 1992. Johnston Heights' exterior highly resembles that of its neighboring high school, North Surrey Secondary School. The Canadian government chose to highlight the school for its program to improve intercultural understanding. Yearly, Johnston Heights' REACH Council has been working to support Multicultural Week, Health Week, World Causes Week and annual holiday celebrations are also held. In 2007–2008, Johnston Heights initially set out to raise $2000 for the KIVA organization (kiva.org) and eventually raised over $2,500.00 to provide micro loans to people in the third-world for their businesses.

== Sport ==
Johnston Heights has also been involved in sports, attending yearly track meets and involving students in lunchtime sports events in the Eagle Dome (the school gym) a double gym. Sports at Johnston Heights include Cross Country, Volleyball, Basketball, Soccer, Badminton, Track and Field, Golf, Ultimate Frisbee, Hockey, Tennis, Cricket, football, and Girls' Rugby. Many students have taken leadership roles to promote healthy lifestyles and daily physical activity.

== Extra-curricular activities ==
Johnston Heights has clubs across a variety of fields: Debate Team, Eagle Council, JH Media Crew, Theatre Company, Model United Nations, Wellness Club, JH Newspaper Committee, JHSS Business Club, Leadership Team, and more. The school’s Business Club organizes workshops, participates in case competitions, and aims to create new leadership opportunities for students. The Johnston Heights Leadership Team (JHLT) is known for their participation in activities outside of the school campus. JHLT have helped coordinate many Runvan events, including the BMO marathon, which occurred on May 1, 2022.

== Academic information ==
Academically, Johnston Heights has promoted school Math Contests, School Speech Meets and has sent students to Provincial Debate Meets in Victoria, Prince George and Vancouver. The school is also in involved in science fairs, musical and theatrical productions and home to Canadian Artist, Math, Music, Science contest winners. The Johnston Heights choir as also been involved with the Whistler Choir festival and placed as a top choir. Johnston Heights offers French, Spanish and language challenge courses for senior students. Programs like ESL (English as a Second Language) and B.A.S.E.S incorporated into the school. The school has a strong academic range, with more than 67% of the school's students on the honour roll. At every end of the year the schools host an awards ceremony called the Gala Awards to celebrate the success of many students and presenting them with awards ranging from math awards (Gauss, Pascal, Fermat etc.) to top academic students per grade. The school has also been a key school in Surrey for hosting the Integrated Studies program in the school from students who would like to take Social Studies and English as one course for the year which is beneficial to letting students have a better chance to explore their learning. The school also offers courses such as Peer-Tutoring, Jewelry Making, Info-Tech, Law, Math Honours, Home Economics: Textiles, Theatre Stage Production and the very popular Home Economics: Foods.

It is notable that Johnston Heights is an IB MHP school. It, along with Semiahmoo Secondary School are the only certified International Baccalaureate secondary schools within Surrey. The school was certified on 28 March 2017.

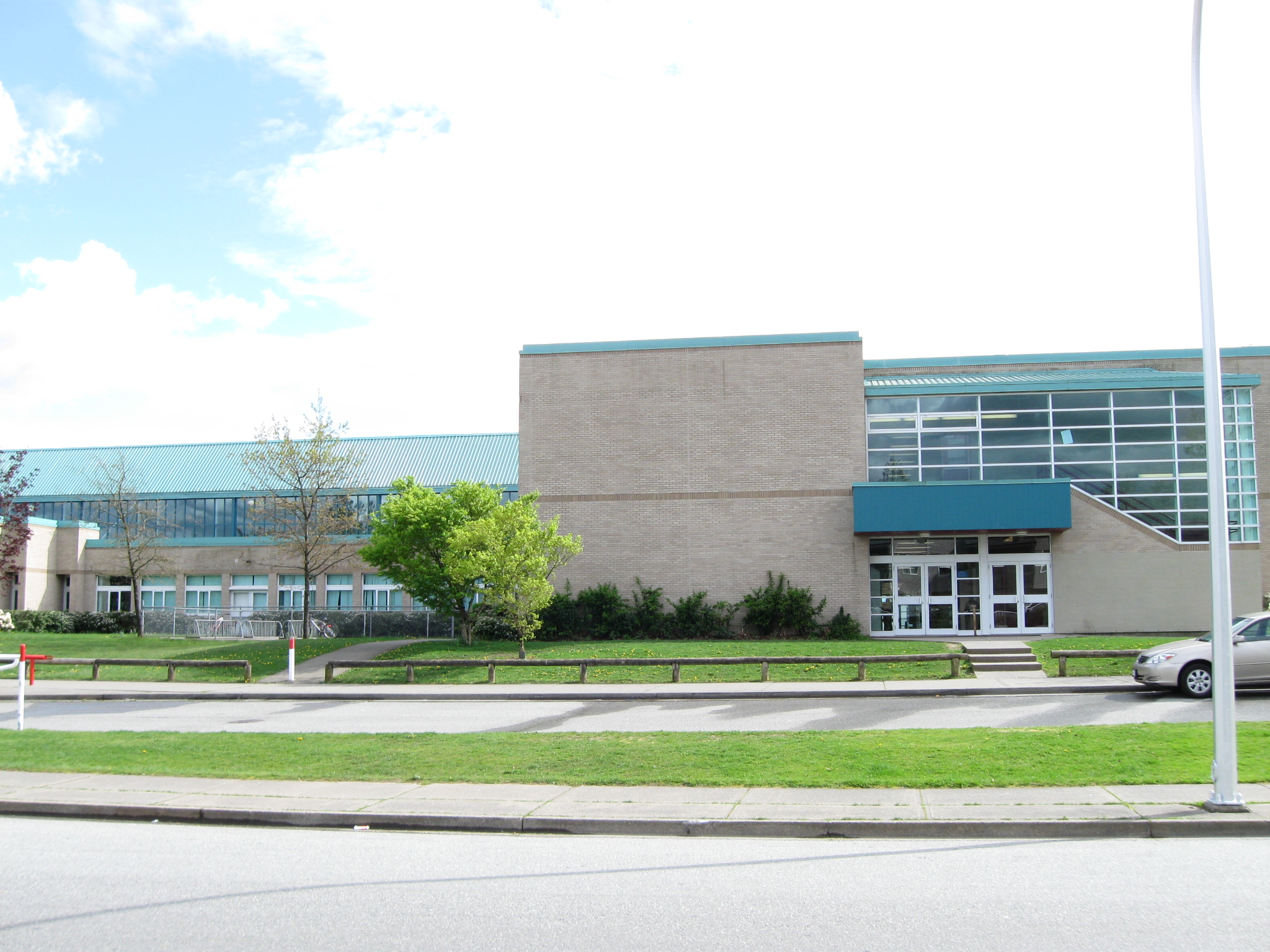
Another view of Johnston Heights Secondary.

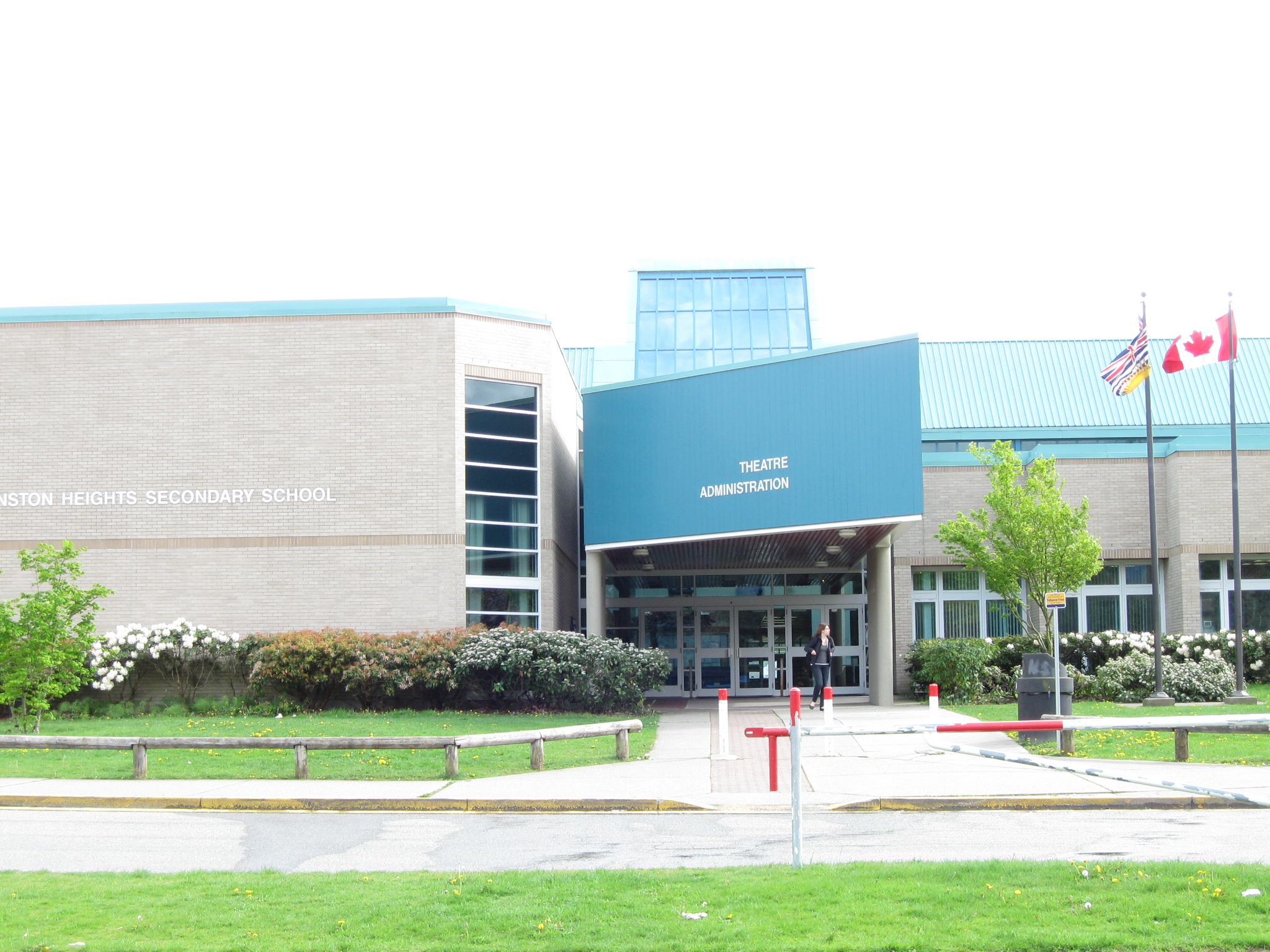
The main entrance to Johnston Heights Secondary.

== International Baccalaureate Programme ==
Johnston Heights Secondary School became an authorized International Baccalaureate (IB) World School on March 28, 2017. It offers the IB Middle Years Programme (MYP) for students in Grades 8 through 10. Along with Semiahmoo Secondary School, it is one of only two public secondary schools in the Surrey School District certified to offer an IB curriculum.

The MYP framework emphasizes interdisciplinary learning, global contexts, and critical thinking across core subject areas, culminating in a personal project in Grade 10.

== Notable alumni ==
- Sydney Leroux, US Women's National Soccer Team player
- Brandon Jay McLaren, actor
- Christabel Nettey, Canadian Long Jumper
- Dr. Lori Brotto, Canadian Psychologist and author
