= L.A. Matheson Secondary School =

L.A. Matheson Secondary
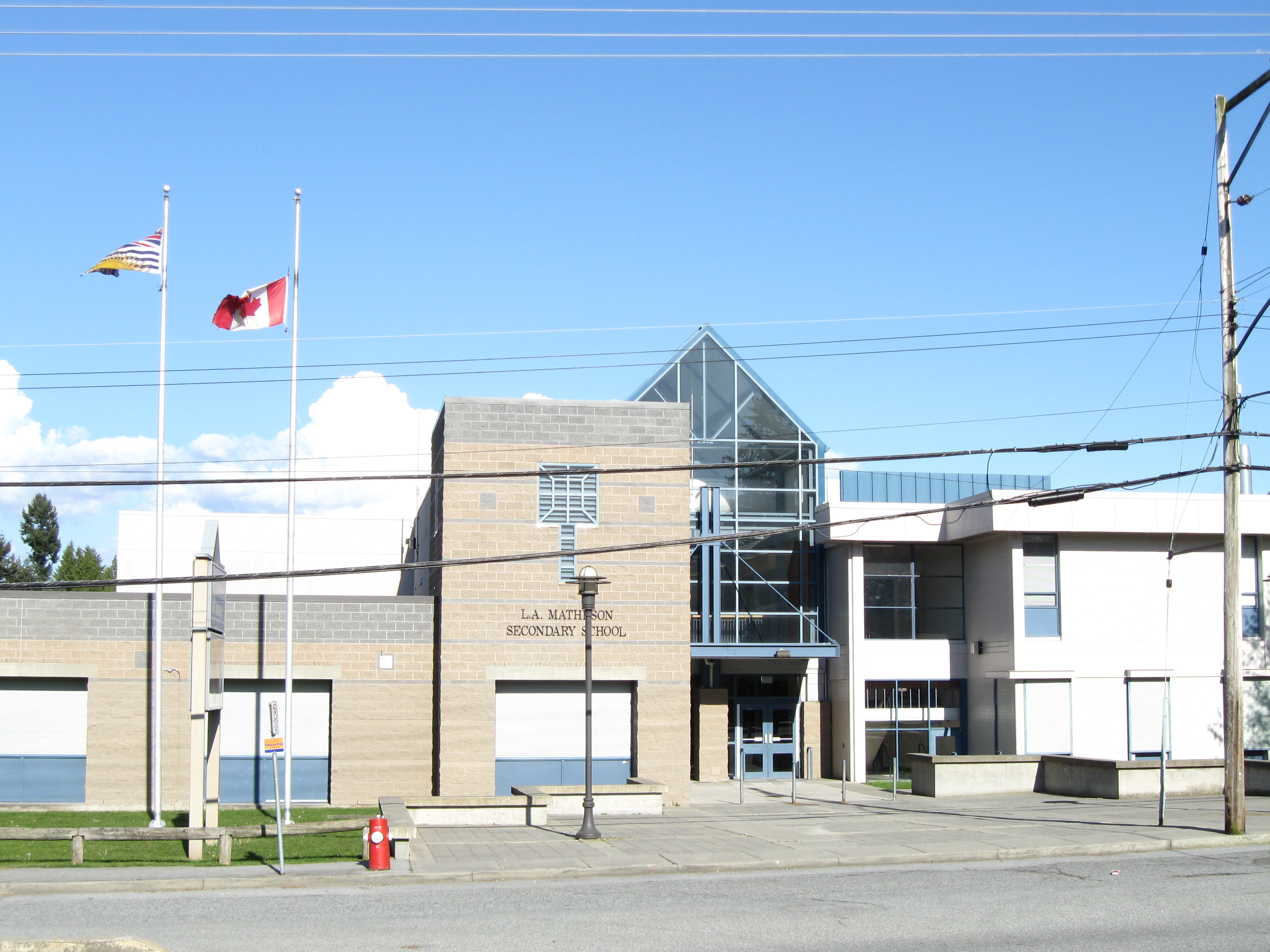

Location
- 9484 122 St; Surrey, British Columbia, V3V 4M1; Canada; 49.1754°N 122.8837°W

Information
- School type: Public, high school
- Founded: 1969
- School board: School District 36 Surrey
- School number: 3636079
- Principal: Sunny Deol
- Staff: 71
- Grades: 8–12
- Enrolment: ▼1,157 (2025)
- Colours: Blue and White
- Mascot: Max
- Team name: Mustangs
- Website: www.sd36.bc.ca/sites/lamath/

L.A. Matheson Secondary School is a public secondary school in Surrey, British Columbia, Canada, and is part of School District 36 Surrey. The school opened in 1969 as a junior secondary school as a feeder to High School but in 1998 became a full secondary school serving grades 8 through 12.

== Academics ==
In the 2015/16 school year, L.A. Matheson Secondary School was ranked 269th out of 293 in the Fraser Institute annual ranking of secondary schools in British Columbia and Yukon.

== Athletics ==
Sports and athletic activities are governed by the Surrey Secondary Schools' Athletic Association. The athletics program includes rugby, volleyball, soccer, swimming, boys' and girls' basketball, cross-country, running and cricket.

== Robotics program ==
In 2017 LA Matheson started a FIRST Robotics Competition team. FIRST (For Inspiration and Recognition of Science and Technology) is an international organization that inspires students from all around the world to explore careers in fields of STEM (Science, Technology, Engineering and Math). The students work with industry mentors to design, build, program and drive a robot that is able to compete in different challenges. The team has competed in both Canada and USA.
