= Cloverdale Learning Centre =

Location
- 5658 176 Street; Surrey, British Columbia, V3S 4C9; Canada
- Coordinates: 49°6′23″N 122°44′6″W

Information
- School type: Public, high school
- Motto: "Success is the only Option"
- School board: School District 36 Surrey
- School number: 3699059
- Principal: Janice Smith
- Staff: 16
- Grades: 10-12
- Enrollment: 139 (2007-09-30)
- Area: Cloverdale
- Website: www.surreyschools.ca/schools/cloverdalelc/Pages/default.aspx

Cloverdale Learning Centre is a public high school in Surrey, British Columbia part of School District 36 Surrey. It is a school providing an alternative and alternate schooling options.

Surrey Schools Learning Centre's are a storefront schools designed to help students set and meet their educational goals. Students learn in a friendly environment which promotes student responsibility for goal-setting and educational planning. Students who are sincere in their desire to learn will find the expectations realistic and the staff understanding, helpful and encouraging. Special career education programs and counselling are available to help students with their goals and career planning.

The school offers a continuous entry and continuous program design featuring a variety of schedules: morning, afternoon or all day classes. Students can complete Grade 10, 11 and 12 courses leading to graduation with either a Dogwood Diploma or an Adult Dogwood Diploma. Learners are able to complete their education within a culture that is caring, safe and comfortable.
