= Fleetwood Park Secondary School =

Fleetwood Park Secondary

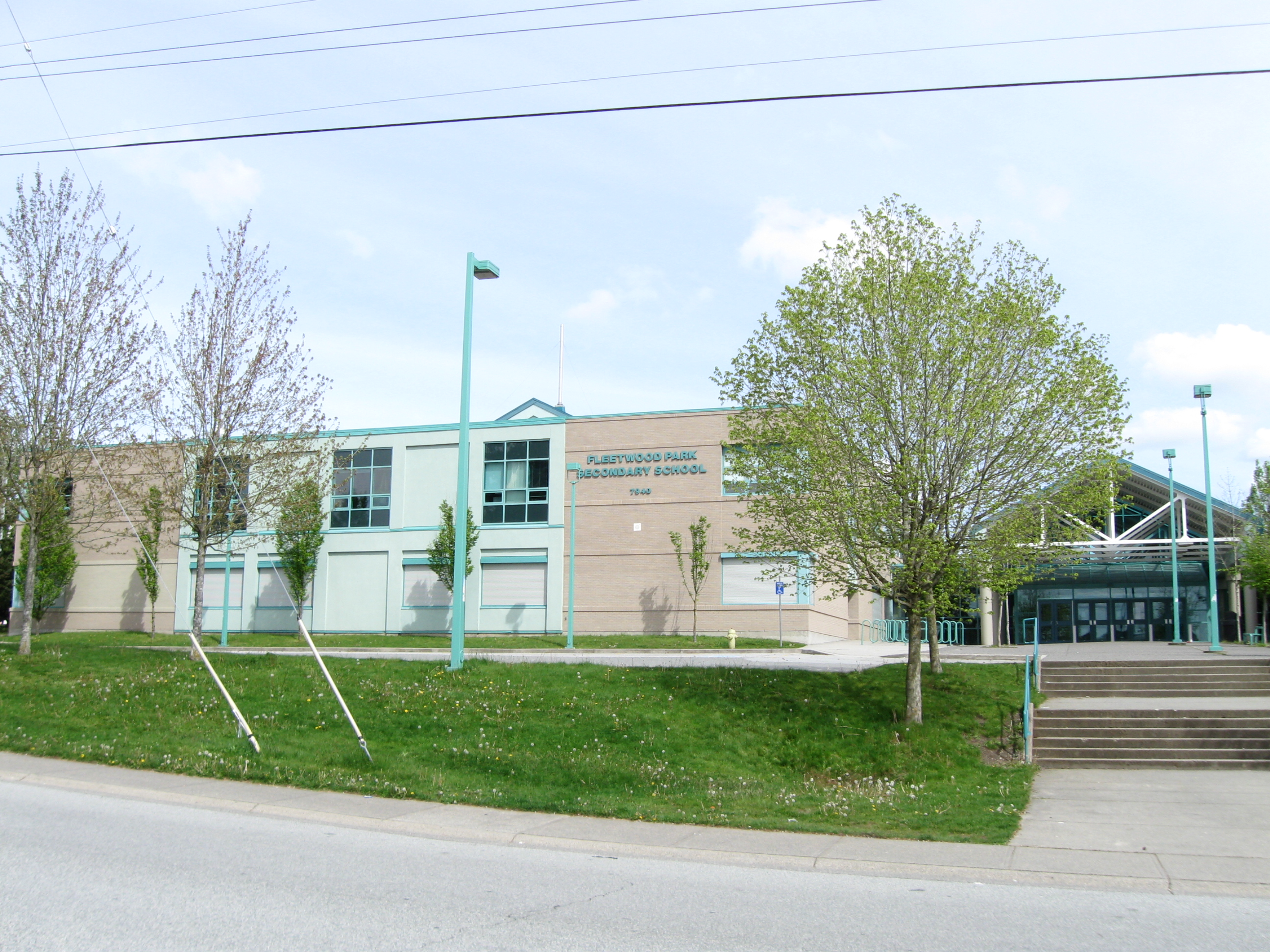

Location
- 7940 156 St; Surrey, British Columbia, V3S 3R3; Canada; 49.1478°N 122.7894°W

Information
- School type: Public, high school
- Motto: Building Successful Futures
- Principal: Ms. Jodie Perry
- Staff: 122
- Grades: 8-12
- Enrollment: ▲1,794 (2025)
- Area: Fleetwood
- Colour: Teal
- Mascot: Dragon
- Team name: Dragons
- Website: www.surreyschools.ca/schools/fltsec

Fleetwood Park Secondary is a public high school in the Metro Vancouver suburb of Surrey, British Columbia part of School District 36 Surrey. The school ranked 48 of 293 according to the Fraser Institute Studies in Education Policy in 2012–2013 with a 97.2% graduation rate.

== Sports ==
In 2014 and 2016 the Senior Girls Soccer team won the AAA Soccer Provincials.
