= Lord Tweedsmuir Secondary School =

Lord Tweedsmuir Secondary
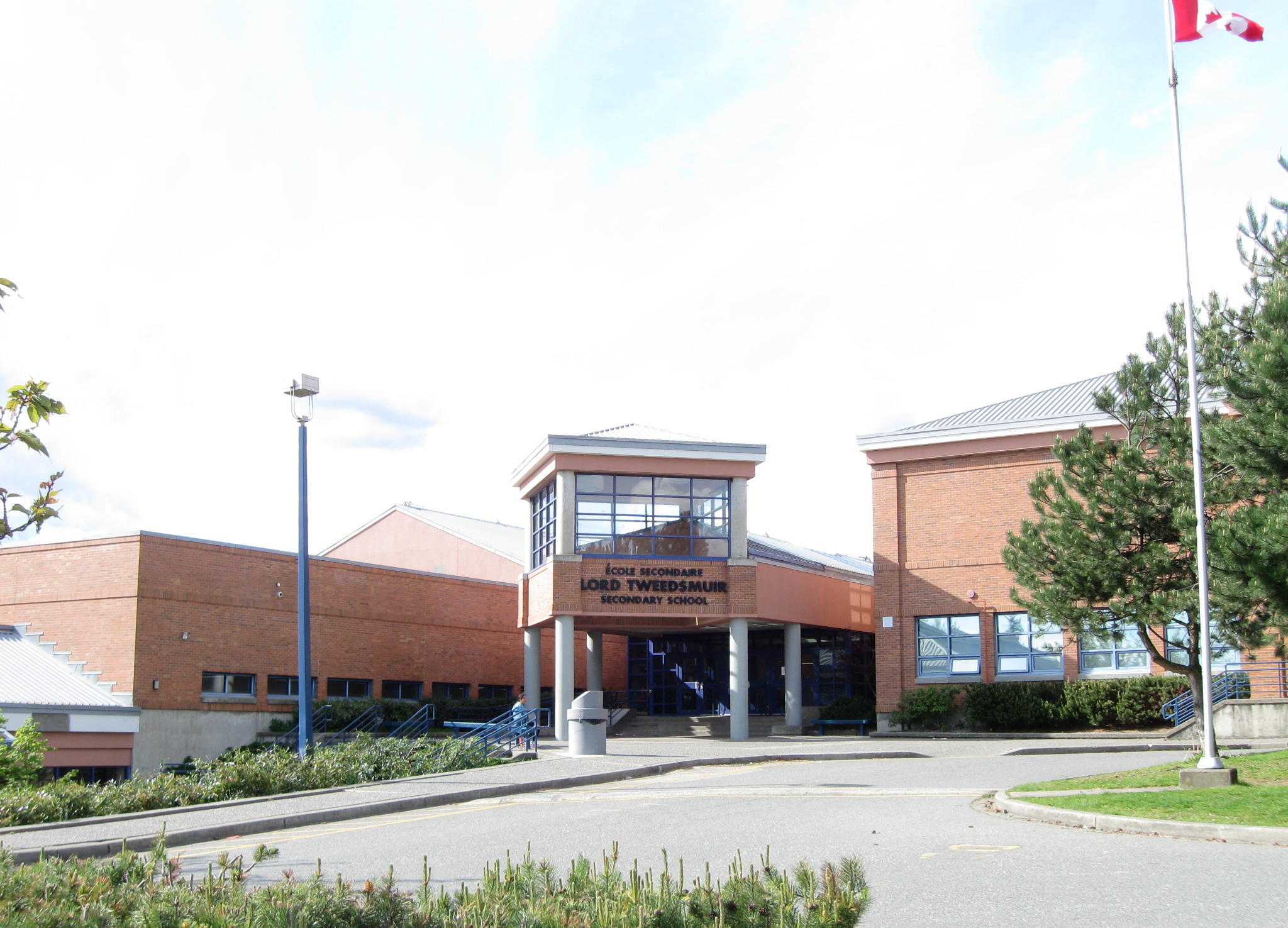

Location
- 6151 180 St; Surrey, British Columbia, V3S 4L5; Canada; 49.1149°N 122.7248°W

Information
- Type: Public high school
- Motto: pride: Personal; Responsibility; In; Developing; Excellence
- Established: 1922; 104 years ago
- School district: School District 36 Surrey
- School number: 3636041
- Principal: Mr. Ken Hignel
- Staff: approx. 123
- Grades: 8-12
- Enrolment: ▼1,885 (2025)
- Classes: 359
- Language: English, French, Spanish
- Schedule type: 5 Block Schedules
- Schedule: Semester System
- Colours: Green and black
- Mascot: Panther
- Website: www.surreyschools.ca/schools/tweeds

Lord Tweedsmuir Secondary is a public high school in the city of Surrey, British Columbia, Canada and is part of School District 36 Surrey. In September 1993, staff and students from Cloverdale Junior Secondary and Lord Tweedsmuir Senior Secondary joined together to form Lord Tweedsmuir Secondary, and moved into the new building. Lord Tweedsmuir's name has been attached to a school in the Cloverdale area since 1940 when Canada's Governor General, John Buchan, Lord Tweedsmuir of Elsfield died.

The school's mascot is the Panther. The school are the rivals of the other nearby secondary schools, École Salish Secondary School and Clayton Heights Secondary School, in various sports, such as Rugby, Soccer, American football, etc. Average class size is 23.5.

== Programs ==
Lord Tweedsmuir Secondary School offers many programs to its students and teachers.

- Choice Program
- School Meal Programs
- Aboriginal Programs
- Online & Distance Learning {SAIL}
- Special Needs Support
- And Much More

== School Clubs ==
- School Library Team Of Volunteers
- Student Council
- Mindfulness Club
- Ad Astra
- Botany Club
- Debate Club
- Future Business Leaders of Canada
- Model United Nations
- Chess Club
- Robotics Club
- Math Homework Help
- Art Club
- Science Homework Help

== Athletic Achievements ==
- Spring 1976 B.C. Rugby Champions
- 2001-2002 District Hockey Champions
- 2005-2006 AA Junior Varsity football provincial champions
- 2016-2017 AAA Senior Girls Basketball Provincial Champions
- 2016-2017 Junior Boys Football Provincial Champions
- 2018-2019 AAAA Senior Boys Basketball Provincial Champions
- 2025-2026 AAA Varsity Boys Football Provincial Champions

== Notable alumni ==
- Laine MacNeil, actress
- Joe Sandor, Directorate European Space agency
- Matthew Stowe, winner of Top Chef Canada (season 3)
- Lanie McCauley, Musician and actress
- Adam Berger, CFL Grey cup winner with The Calgary Stampeders and the Ottawa Red blacks
- Brittany Reimer, Olympian in swimming
- Tremel States-Jones, football player for South Alabama Jaguars football
- Arjun Samra, Basketball player for UBC Thunderbirds
- Jennifer Gardiner, Ice Hockey player for PWHL Vancouver, Olympian Medalist 2026
