= Panorama Ridge Secondary School =

École Panorama Ridge Secondary
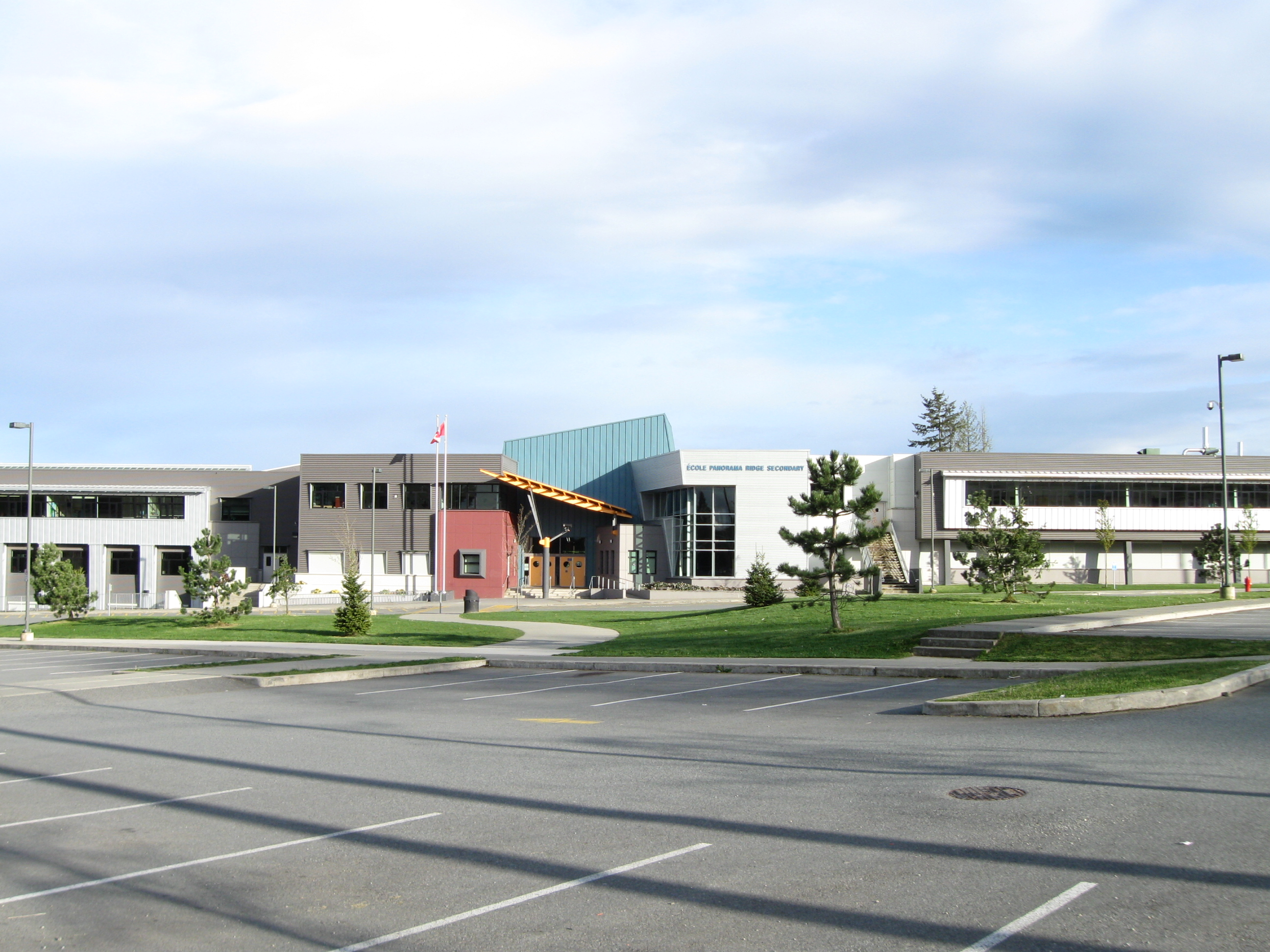

Location
- 13220 - 64 Avenue; Surrey, British Columbia, V3W 1X9; Canada; 49.1182°N 122.8552°W

Information
- School type: Public, high school
- Motto: "Learn to live; live to learn"
- Founded: 2006
- School board: School District 36 Surrey
- Principal: Mr. Ghuman, Ms. Bifolchi, Mrs. Shier, Mr. Evans
- Staff: 95
- Grades: 8-12
- Enrolment: 1,560 (March 2019)
- Language: English, French
- Colours: Blue/white/silver
- Mascot: Thor
- Team name: Thunder
- Website: www.surreyschools.ca/schools/panoramaridge/Pages/default.aspx

Panorama Ridge Secondary is a public high school in Surrey, British Columbia, Canada and is part of School District 36 Surrey. It has a French immersion program for students in grades 8-12 and approximately 20% of the school's students are enrolled in that program. The school's website publishes notices in both English and Punjabi. It opened in September 2006, and is the second newest secondary school in the Surrey School District.

== Athletics ==
Panorama Ridge Secondary has a variety of sports teams, an after school volleyball league and intramurals ranging from soccer to ice hockey, volleyball, basketball, badminton, rugby, golf, cross country, among countless other activities. All of which run throughout the year. The school has won several championship banners.

== School Culture ==
Panorama Ridge Secondary is a diverse school and has a variety of clubs, programs, and extracurricular activities that are offered. The school has a music program with concert band, jazz band, choir, and guitar courses offered. There are many clubs held at the school such as the we club, the vocal jazz club, the gingerbread team, and the activity club (for making new friends). The dance program at the school has a variety of teams and courses such as a lyrical team, multiple hip-hop teams, bhanrga teams and break teams. The school also has a large theatre department with musicals and plays held every year.

== Pictures ==
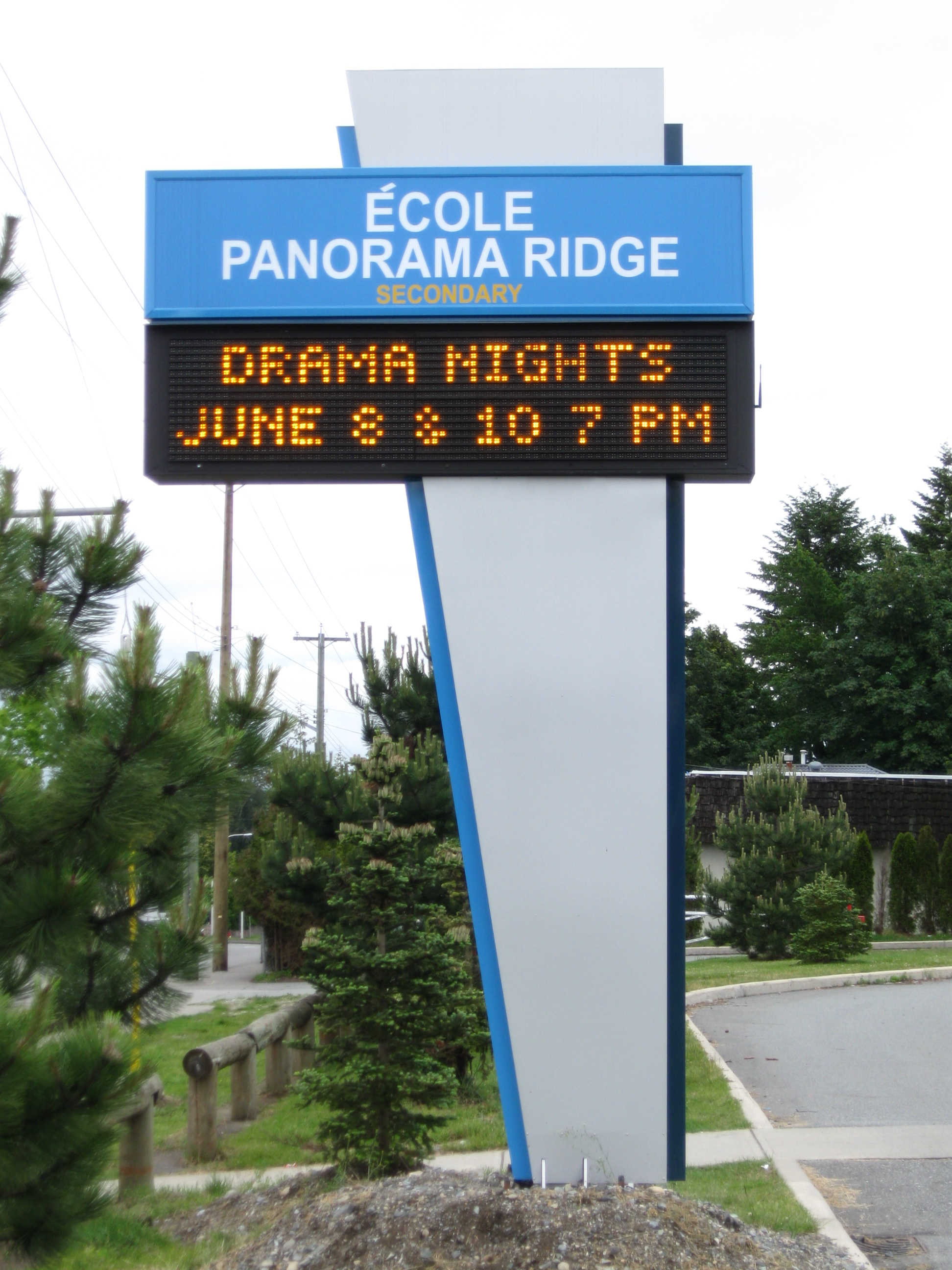
Panorama Ridge school noticeboard

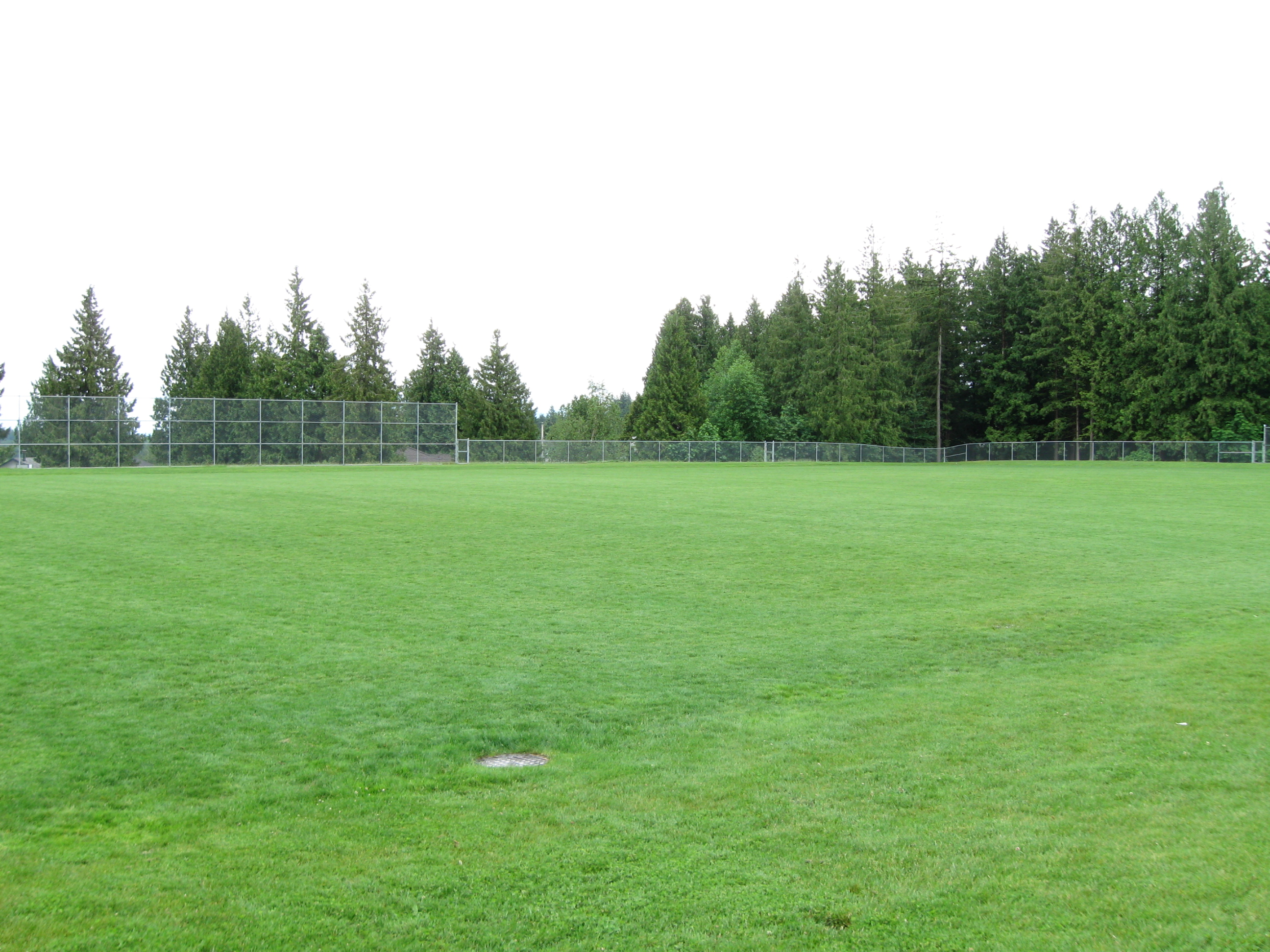
Panorama Ridge school field
