= Sullivan Heights Secondary =

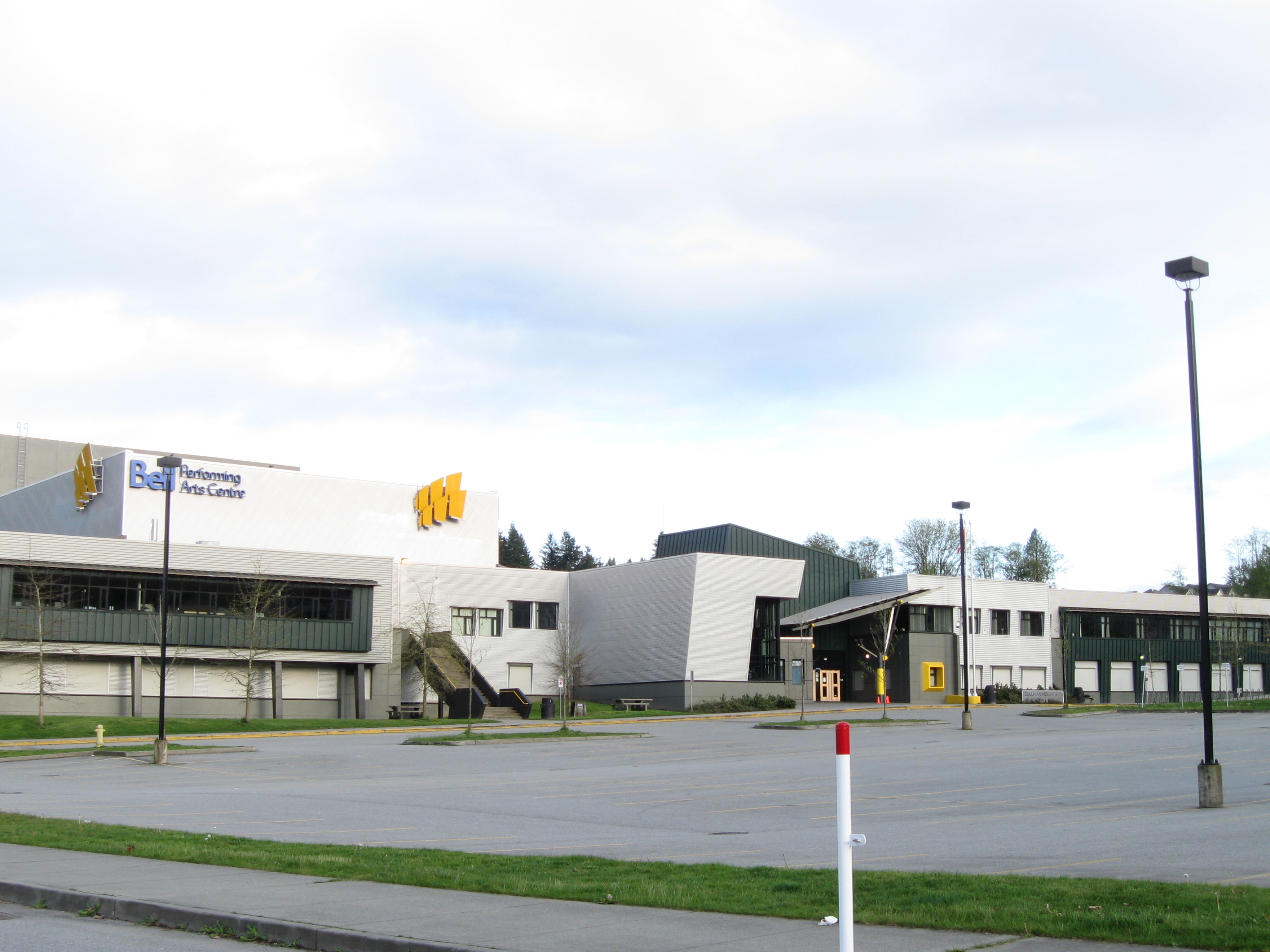

Location
- 6248 144 Street; Surrey, British Columbia, V3X 1A1; Canada; 49.1164°N 122.8218°W

Information
- School type: Public, high school
- Founded: 2000
- School board: School District 36 Surrey
- Superintendent: Mark Pearmain
- Principal: Nikolas Kirincic
- Staff: 100
- Grades: 8–12
- Enrollment: 1970 (2024–25)
- Language: English and French
- Area: Panorama, Sullivan
- Team name: Sullivan Heights Stars
- Website: www.surreyschools.ca/sullivanheights

Sullivan Heights Secondary is a high school located in Surrey, British Columbia, Canada.

The school has expanded with a modern four floor addition to alleviate overcrowding and to add new educational facilities. Completed in September 2022, this $34.3-million project introduced 28 new educational spaces, including classrooms, science and food labs, a digital arts studio, dance studios, and multi-purpose rooms. This expansion also featured a new gymnasium and an outdoor basketball court with amphitheater-style seating. The expansion resulted in the school bringing up its total number of educational spaces up to 68 and brought the seating up to 1,700 students.

== Notable alumni ==
- Elicia MacKenzie, winner of the reality show How Do You Solve a Problem Like Maria?
