= Fraser Heights Secondary School =

Coordinates: 49.1979°N 122.7772°W

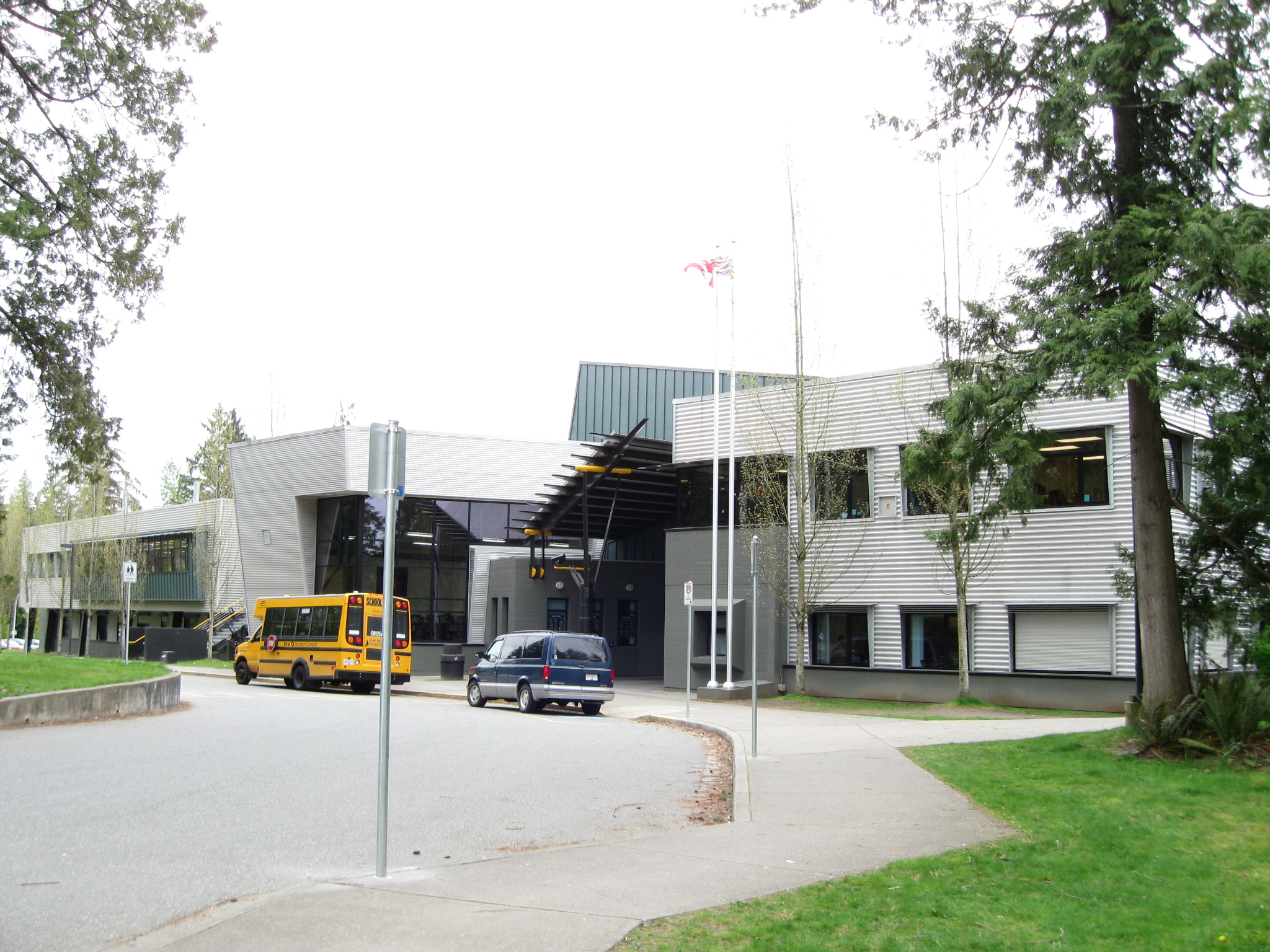

Location
- 16060 108 Avenue; Surrey, British Columbia, V4N 1M1; Canada

Information
- School type: Public, high school
- Motto: Soaring to New Heights
- Founded: 2000
- School board: School District 36 Surrey
- Principal: David Baldasso
- Staff: 128
- Grades: 8–12
- Enrolment: ▲1,630 (2025)
- Language: English
- Area: Fraser Heights
- Colours: Dark Blue, Crimson, White
- Team name: Firehawks
- Feeder schools: Fraser Wood Elementary, Erma Stephenson Elementary, Dogwood Elementary, Bothwell Elementary
- Website: www.surreyschools.ca/schools/fraserheights/

Fraser Heights Secondary is a public high school in the Fraser Heights neighbourhood situated in Surrey, British Columbia and is part of School District 36 Surrey.

The school is known for its excellence in provincial badminton and volleyball; academics, particularly in the sciences; and extracurricular opportunities.

Fraser Heights has an average class size of 28 students.

A $14 million expansion wing with sixteen new classrooms and an open area for community use opened in the spring of 2014.

== Programs ==
Fraser Heights Secondary offers a wide variety of academic, athletic, and fine arts programs that have gained high acclaim across the Lower Mainland. Fraser Heights also offers a variety of advanced placement courses, including honours courses in math, science, and liberal arts.

Fraser Heights is a branch school to the late French immersion programs offered at Fraser Wood Elementary and Erma Stephenson Elementary.

=== Science Academy ===
One of Fraser Heights' academic programs is a joint venture with Simon Fraser University called Science Academy. This is an all-year course extending over a period of two years, from grade 11 to grade 12. The course combines Pre-Calc 12, AP Calculus BC, Chemistry 11 and 12, Physics 11 and 12, AP Physics I and II, and a choice between Chemistry and Computer Science at Simon Fraser University.

=== School clubs ===
Fraser Heights offers many school clubs, such as the Homework club, Biology club, and the Environment club club.

Fraser Heights also offers the Math Contest Club, which focuses on the improvement of skills used in various math competitions, most notably the annual Math Challengers competition. Fraser Heights also has many notable alumni who are members of the Math Club, many of whom participated in competitions at both provincial and national levels.

=== Notable Achievements ===
The Fraser Heights senior badminton team captured the school’s first provincial AAA title by winning the 2012 provincial championships in competition with private school powerhouses Vancouver College and Little Flower Academy. The senior badminton team won the provincial championships again in 2015, 2016, 2017, 2018, 2019, and 2020. The volleyball program has also grown to acclaim in past years, with a combined fourteen Surrey championships and three Fraser Valley championships. It is consistently ranked in the top three Senior Boys' AAA provincial rankings.

Members of the Debate team at Fraser Heights Secondary qualified for the Senior Nationals Tournament in 2022, following an impressive fourth-place showing in the senior category at the provincial debates.

Members of the Fraser Heights Math Contest Club managed to rank 2nd place provincially for the 2024 Math Challengers (hosted at UBC).
