= Frank Hurt Secondary School =

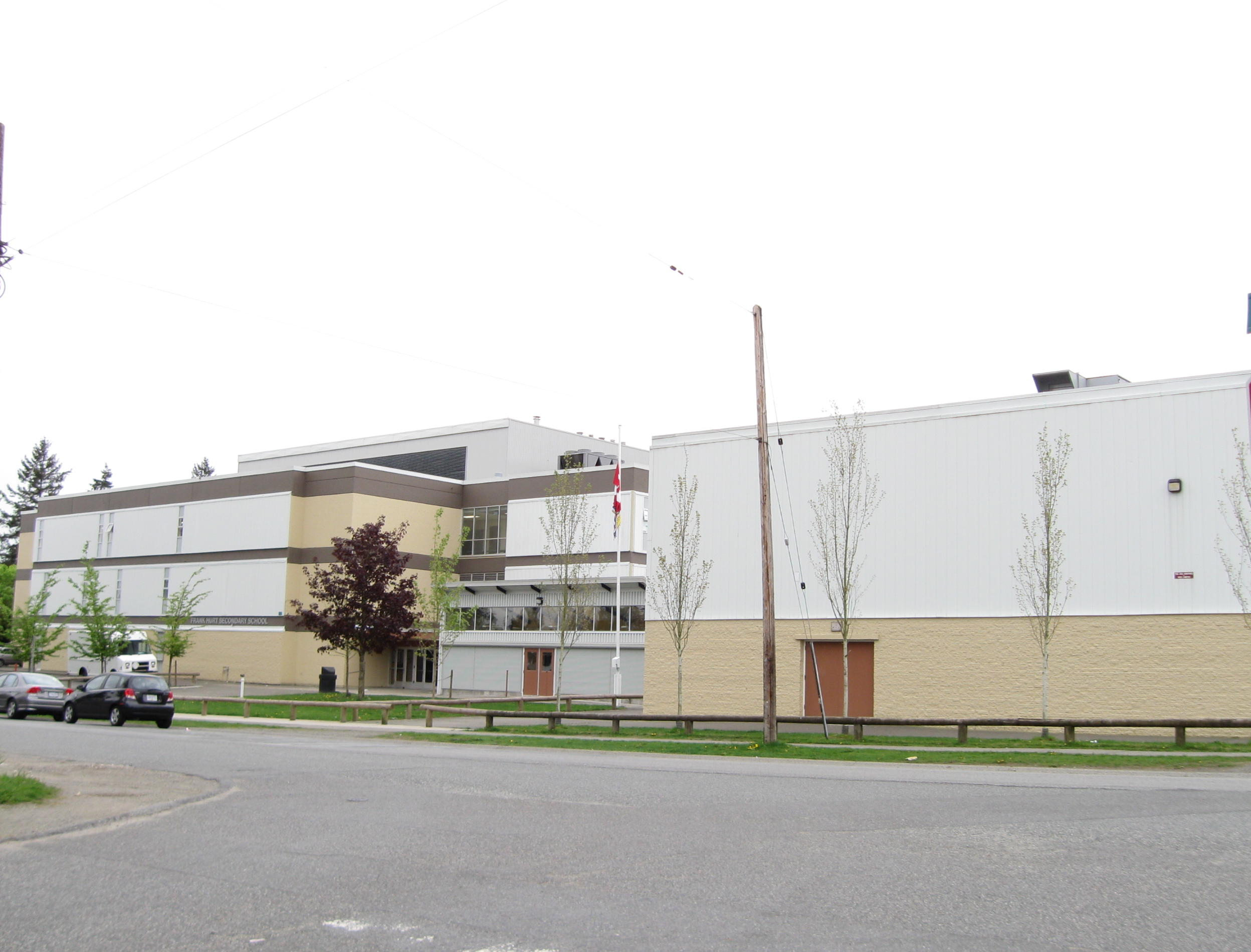

Location
- 13940 77 Avenue; Surrey, British Columbia, V3W 5Z4; Canada
- Coordinates: 49.1423°N 122.8366°W

Information
- Type: Public high school
- Motto: Once a Hornet, always a Hornet
- School district: School District 36 Surrey
- Superintendent: Mark Pearmain
- School number: 3636106
- Staff: 100
- Grades: 8-12
- Enrolment: ▲1,560 (2025)
- Area: Newton
- Colours: Black, Grey, White
- Mascot: Hornet
- Team name: The Hornets
- Website: Frank Hurt Secondary

Frank Hurt Secondary School is a public high school in the East Newton area of Surrey, British Columbia, Canada. It is part of the provincial School District 36 Surrey.

== Gallery ==
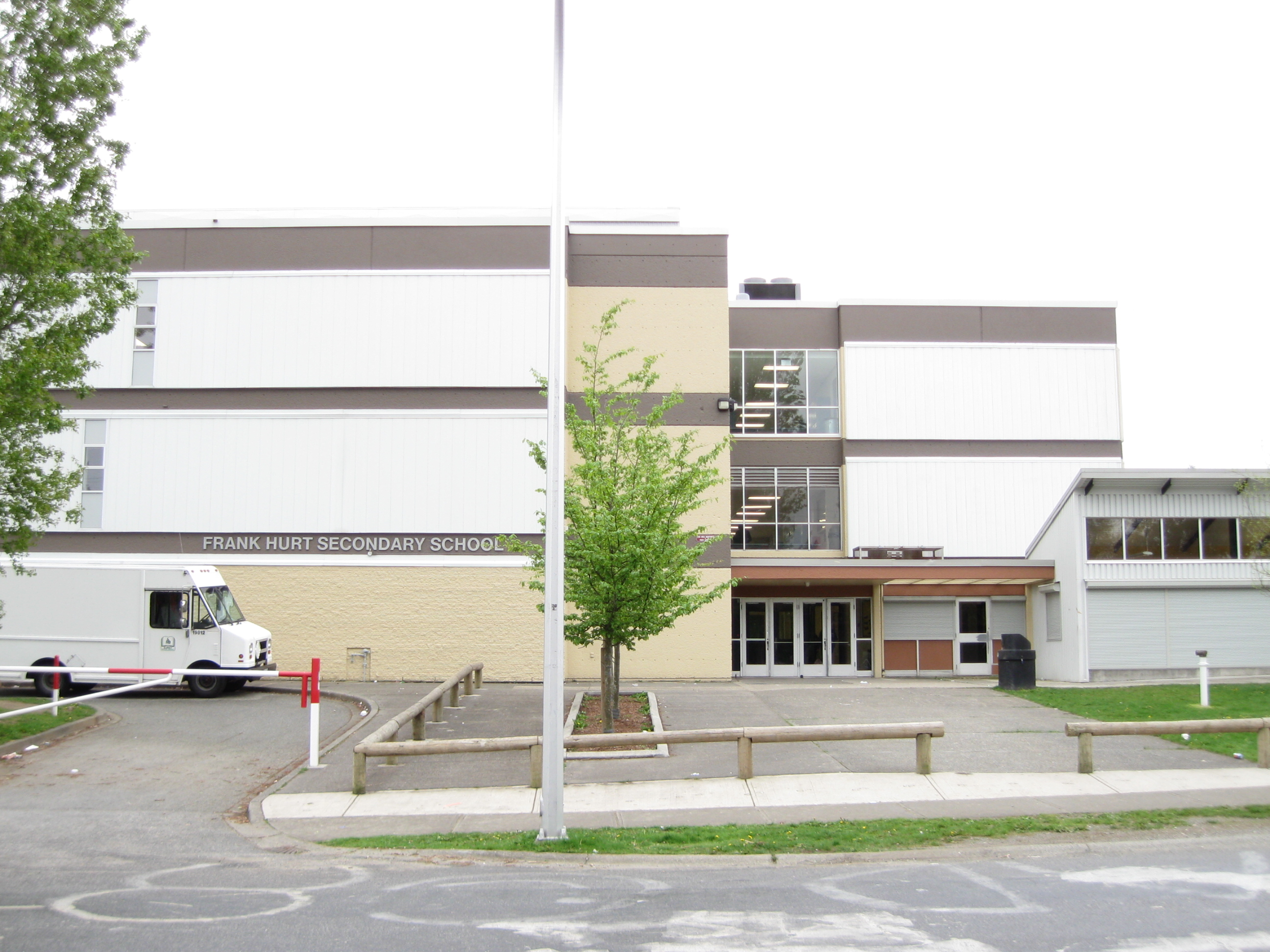
The main entrance to Frank Hurt Secondary.

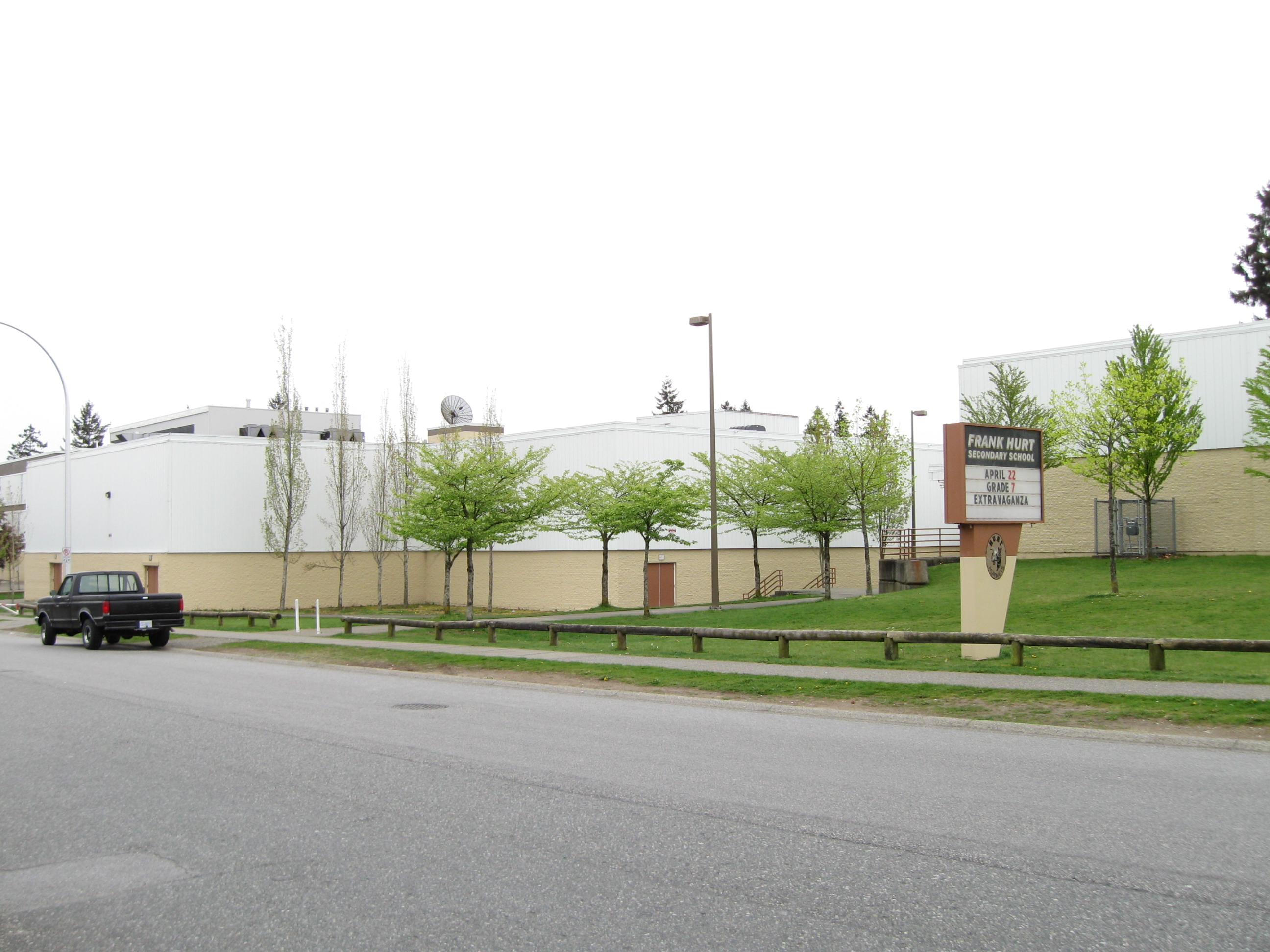
The noticeboard sign for Frank Hurt Secondary.
