= North Surrey Secondary School =

North Surrey Secondary
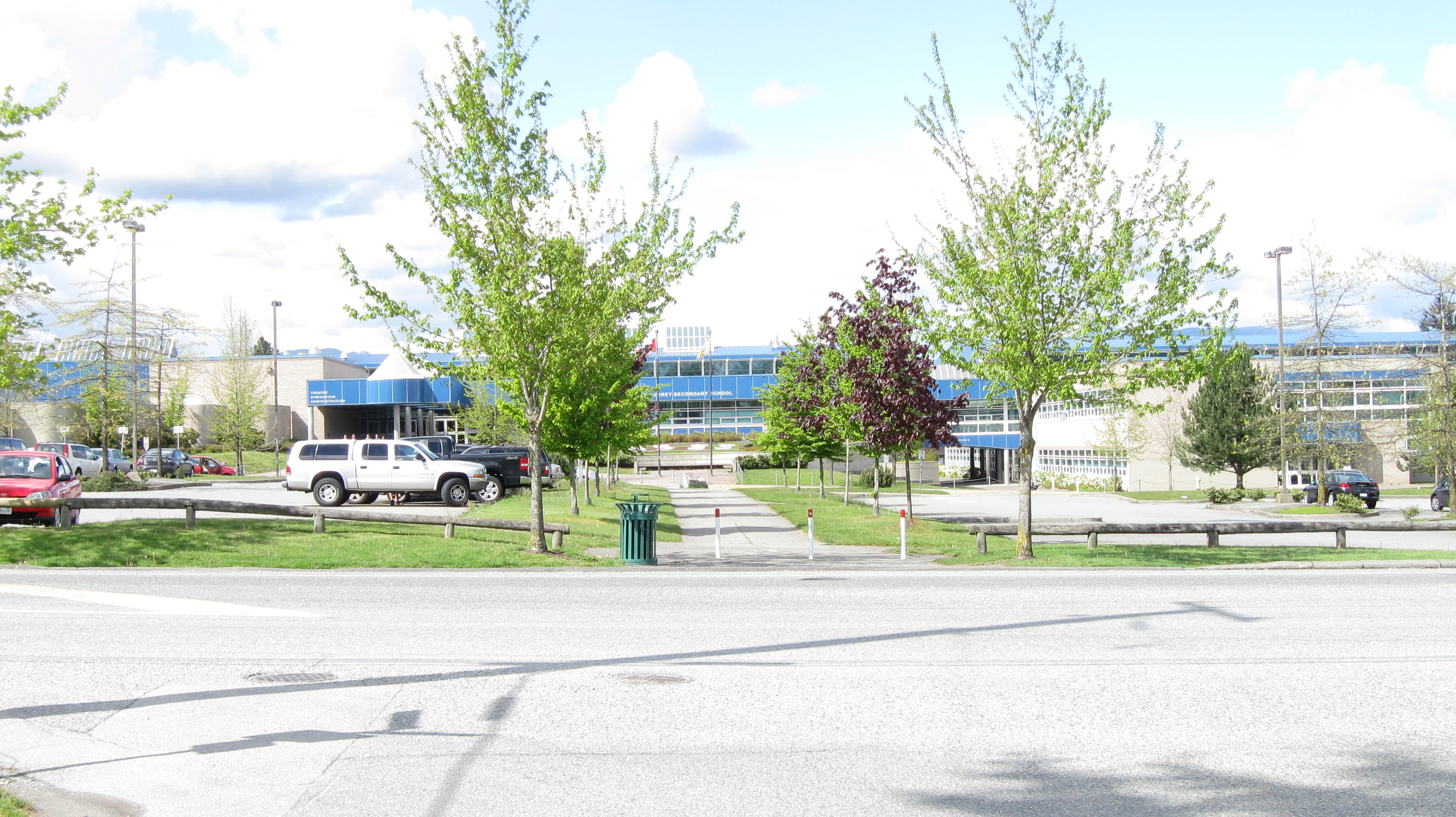

Location
- 15945 96 ave Surrey, British Columbia, V4N 2R8; Canada; 49.178337°N 122.780458°W

Information
- School type: Public, high school
- Motto: Ad Solem (To the Sun.)
- School board: School District 36 Surrey
- School number: 3636028
- Principal: Mr. Stipp
- Staff: 102
- Grades: 8-12
- Enrolment: ▼1,450 (2025)
- Colours: Red, White and Black
- Mascot: Greek soldier
- Team name: Spartans
- Website: www.sd36.bc.ca/NorthSurreySecondary/

North Surrey Secondary is a public high school in Surrey, British Columbia and is part of School District 36 Surrey. The current structure dates from 1993, but the site has been in use since 1949. During the 1999–2000 year, a track was constructed on property north of the main building. The school is notable for its drama and art departments, both of which have been the recipient of several awards. Several movies have been filmed at the school including Agent Cody Banks.

== Alumni ==
- John Tenta – Professional Wrestler
- Brad Lazarowich – NHL Linesman
- Colin Fraser – Professional Hockey Player
- Laurent Brossoit – Hockey Player
- Devin Townsend – Musician
- Dylan Kingwell - Actor
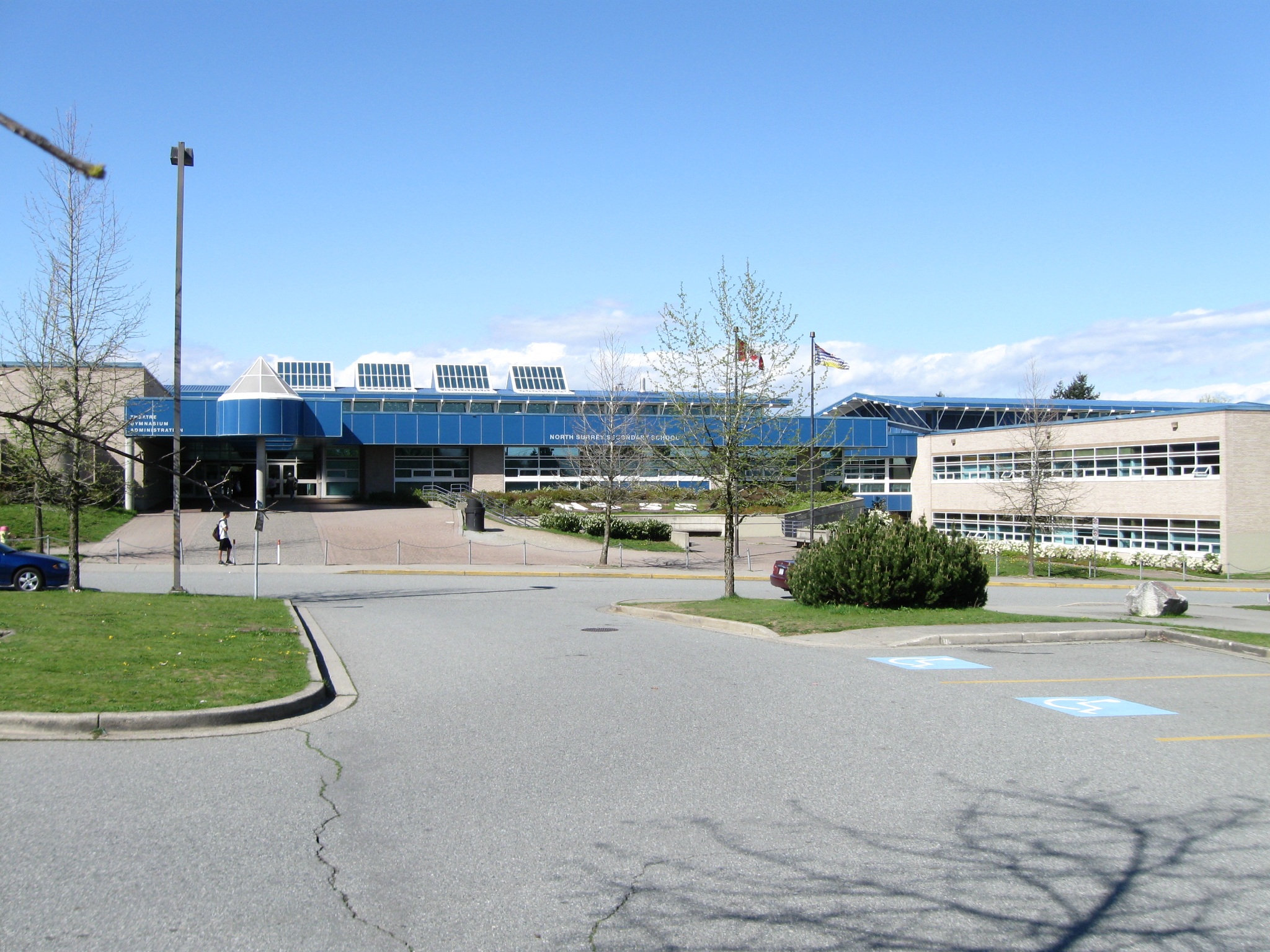
The main entrance to North Surrey secondary.
