= Fraser Heights =

- Neighbourhood of Surrey
- Location of Fraser Heights within Metro Vancouver
- Coordinates: 49.1988°N 122.7787°W
- Country: Canada
- Province: British Columbia
- Region: Lower Mainland
- Regional District: Metro Vancouver
- City: Surrey
- Town Centre: Guildford

Government
  - Mayor: Brenda Locke
  - MP (Fed.): Ken Hardie (Liberal)
  - MLA (Prov.): Garry Begg (NDP)
- Time zone: UTC−8 (PST)
  - Summer (DST): UTC−7 (PDT)

Fraser Heights is a neighbourhood of Guildford, a town centre in the city of Surrey, British Columbia. Bounded by Highway 1 to the south, Golden Ears Connector and Golden Ears Way to the east and the Fraser River to the north, with most homes having a view of the Fraser River and Coquitlam Mountain.

== Demographics ==
Residents of the neighbourhood consist mostly of upper-income families and zoned for large single family homes. The population was estimated to be about 25,000 people in 2014.
