= Pharmaceutical Advertising Advisory Board =

Canadian not-for-profit organization

- Formation: 1976; 49 years ago
- Headquarters: Pickering, Ontario
- Website: https://www.paab.ca/

The Pharmaceutical Advertising Advisory Board (PAAB) is a Canadian not-for-profit organization based in Pickering, Ontario. Acting as a pseudo-regulatory body, PAAB offers review and pre-clearance services recognized by Health Canada to pharmaceutical companies and marketing agencies who wish to advertise directly to consumers and/or healthcare professionals. It is financed on a fee-for-service basis.

It works collaboratively with Health Canada, with the federal agency represented as an ex-oficio member on PAAB's board of directors.

== History ==
PAAB originated in 1976 through a collaboration between the Pharmaceutical Manufacturing Association of Canada and the Canadian Medical Association. Within its first year, the organization had two staff members and had reviewed some 400 applications. As of July 1977, all advertisements printed in the Canadian Medical Association Journal carried the PAAB seal of approval following an examination of their quality and accuracy. In 2004, PAAB's Patient Material Code was revised to include materials provided to patients by healthcare providers as well as adding regulations to standardize advertising over the internet.

As of 2015, PAAB reported completing over 7,000 "first reviews" annually.

== Activities ==
Advertising materials for all health products in Canada that are intended for healthcare professionals are submitted for review and pre-clearance by PAAB, who prescribes the guidelines for direct marketing to this group. Educational materials and other messaging directed towards consumers on prescription drugs, and the medical conditions they treat are reviewed by PAAB and Advertising Standards Canada to ensure compliance with regulatory requirements. While these reviews are not mandatory, PAAB is obligated to forward all safety-related complaints to Health Canada.

== Organization ==
=== Governance ===
==== Board of directors ====
PAAB is governed by a board of 12 members, including representation from industry associations Innovative Medicines Canada, BIOTECanada, Association of Medical Advertising Agencies, Canadian Association of Medical Publisher and Consumer Health Products Canada.

- Lorenzo Biondi (Chair)
- Cécile Bensimon (Vice Chair)
- Jim Hall (Canadian Association of Medical Publishers, Treasurer)
- Alex Dearham (Canadian Medical Association)
- Joseph Chan (Food, Health & Consumer Products of Canada)
- Anita Hammer (BIOTECanada)
- Lama Abi Khaled (Innovative Medicines Canada )
- James Mastin (Nurse Practitioner Association of Canada)
- Sean McNamara (Canadian Dental Association)
- Denis Morrice (Best Medicines Coalition)
- Michael Service (Canadian Healthcare Communications Providers)
- Tammy Quinn (Canadian Pharmacists Association)
- Agni Shah (Consumer Council of Canada)
- Kristen Willemsen (Canadian Generic Pharmaceutical Association)

Notable former members of the board include Susan Eng, former Chair of the Canadian Association of Retired Persons.

=== Clients ===
Clients of PAAB include pharmaceutical companies and advertising agencies working on behalf of pharmaceutical interests.

- 3M
- Abbott Laboratories
- AbbVie
- Acadia Healthcare
- Actavis
- Actelion
- Alcon
- Allergan
- Amgen
- Antibody Healthcare Communications
- Apotex
- Aspen Pharmacare
- AstraZeneca
- Bausch Health
- Baxalta
- Baxter International
- Bayer
- Biogen
- Boehringer Ingelheim
- Boiron
- Bristol Myers Squibb
- Celgene
- Dr. Reddy's Laboratories
- Eli Lilly and Company
- EMD Serono
- Emergent BioSolutions
- Environics
- FCB Health Canada
- Ferring Pharmaceuticals
- FleishmanHillard
- Fresenius Kabi
- Galderma
- GE Healthcare
- Gilead Sciences
- GlaxoSmithKline
- Hill+Knowlton Strategies
- Indegene
- Indivior
- IQVIA
- Janssen
- Johnson & Johnson
- Knight Therapeutics
- Kyowa Kirin
- Leo Pharma
- Lundbeck
- Lupin Pharmaceutical
- McCann
- McKesson Corporation
- McNeil Consumer Healthcare
- Mead Johnson
- Meda Pharmaceuticals
- Medikidz
- Merck
- Merz Pharma
- Mylan Pharmaceuticals
- Novartis
- Novo Nordisk
- Octapharma
- Otsuka Pharmaceutical
- Paladin Labs
- Pfizer
- Pierre Fabre Group
- Publicis
- Purdue Pharma
- Roche
- Sandoz
- Sanofi Aventis
- Sanofi Pasteur
- Seagen
- Servier
- Shire
- Sobi
- Stallergenes Greer
- Sunovion
- Syneos Health
- Takeda Pharmaceutical Company
- TBWA Worldwide
- Teva Pharmaceuticals
- UCB
- Valneva
- Vertex Pharmaceuticals
- ViiV Healthcare
- Weber Shandwick
