= Innovative Medicines Canada =

Association of pharmaceutical companies

- Formation: April 1914; 112 years ago
- Headquarters: Ottawa, Ontario
- President: Cole Pinnow
- Affiliations: Health Research Foundation
- Website: https://innovativemedicines.ca/
- Formerly called: Canadian Association of Manufacturers of Medicinal and Toilet Products (1914-1915) Canadian Pharmaceutical Manufacturers Association (1915-1965) Pharmaceutical Manufacturers Association of Canada (1965-1999) Canada’s Research-Based Pharmaceutical Companies (1999-2016)

Innovative Medicines Canada (IMC) is a national association of pharmaceutical companies that represents the interests of the research-based pharmaceutical industry in Canada. Its membership includes biopharmaceutical companies, vaccine developers, and manufacturers of medical devices, and works with government agencies, insurance companies, healthcare professionals and other stakeholders in the regulation and promotion of medicines.

IMC is headquartered in Ottawa, Ontario, and its board of directors is chaired by Pfizer Canada President Cole Pinnow.

== History ==
In April 1914, representatives from ten Canadian pharmaceutical and personal hygiene companies founded the Canadian Association of Manufacturers of Medicinal and Toilet Products. The organization initially accepted individuals as members as opposed to companies themselves, with the original membership including leading figures from Frederick Stearns & Company, F.W. Horner, John Wyeth & Bros., Toronto Pharmacal, Parke, Davis & Co., Seely Manufacturing, Charles E. Frosst & Co., National Drug & Chemical Co., Lyman Bros. & Co., and Henry K. Wampole & Co.

In 1915, the organization changed its name to the Canadian Pharmaceutical Manufacturers Association, and by 1924 had established separate divisions for pharmaceuticals, perfumes and physician supplies. The name was changed again in 1965 to the Pharmaceutical Manufacturers Association of Canada (PMAC), and to Canada’s Research-Based Pharmaceutical Companies (Rx&D) in 1999. Finally, in 2016, the name Innovative Medicines Canada was introduced.

In 2020, IMC contested price regulation reforms introduced by Government of Canada that would require increased financial reporting from pharmaceutical companies, while simultaneously reducing reporting requirements related to veterinary medicines, over-the-counter drugs and most generic medicines.

Cole Pinnow, President of Pfizer Canada, was announced as the new chair of IMC's Board of Directors in November 2021. In April 2022, IMC implemented a revised Code of Ethical Practices that included significant changes aimed to reduce the promotional nature of its educational programs.

== Organization ==
IMC is represented on the board of directors for the Pharmaceutical Advertising Advisory Board (PAAB) by Crawford Wright, head of compliance at EMD Serono.

=== Membership ===
==== Current members ====
Members of IMC as of May 2022 include:

- AbbVie
- Amgen
- Amicus Therapeutics
- Astellas Pharma
- AstraZeneca
- Bayer
- BioCryst Pharmaceuticals
- BioVectra
- Boehringer Ingelheim
- Bristol Myers Squibb
- Brunel
- Ceapro
- Charles River Laboratories
- Council for Continuing Pharmaceutical Education
- Eli Lilly and Company
- Elvium Life Sciences
- EMD Serono
- Emergent BioSolutions
- Endoceutics
- Gilead Sciences
- GlaxoSmithKline
- Horizon Therapeutics
- Incyte
- Ipsen
- Janssen
- JN Nova
- Knight Therapeutics
- Leo Pharma
- Lundbeck
- Medicago
- Merck
- Nordic Pharma
- Novartis
- Novo Nordisk
- Novocure
- Otsuka Pharmaceutical
- Paladin Labs
- Pfizer
- Roche
- Ropack Pharma Solutions
- Sanofi
- Santen Pharmaceutical
- Servier
- Sobi
- Sunovion
- Takeda Pharmaceutical Company
- Theratechnologies
- Valeo Pharma
- Vantage Biotrials

==== Former members ====
Former members include Actelion, Almirall, Eisai, Ferring Pharmaceuticals, Genome Canada, ProMetic Life Sciences, Purdue Pharma, Sanofi Pasteur, Shire, and Therapure BioPharma.

=== Health Research Foundation ===
Canada’s Health Research Foundation (HRF) is a non-profit organization that invests in health research in Canadian academic centres, and promotes the benefits and values of research-driven health innovation in Canada. Innovative Medicines Canada members pay an annual contribution of $1 million to the Foundation.
