= Canada Drugs =

Former online pharmacy

Canada Drugs otherwise known as CanadaDrugs.com, was an online pharmacy based in Winnipeg, Manitoba.

It was started in 2001 by former Manitoba pharmacist Kristjan Thorkelson as an offshoot of a chain of four local pharmacies, called The Prescription Shop, in Winnipeg. With the company being one of the first in the suddenly-growing Canadian internet mail-order pharmacy industry, Thorkelson was hailed as an "internet pharmacy pioneer."

It eventually became Canada's largest pharmacy, providing worldwide prescription services and had filled over 1,000,000 international and Canadian prescriptions through its mail-order facilities.

On 13 July 2018, it was shut down as a result of charges by the United States government for importing counterfeit, unapproved drugs between 2009 and 2012 into the US. American prosecutors accused the company of having made at least $78 million through illegal imports, including two that were counterfeit versions of the cancer drugs Avastin and Altuzan that had no active ingredients.

== Origin ==
Canada Drugs was started in 2001 by former Manitoba pharmacist Kristjan Thorkelson as an offshoot of a chain of four local pharmacies, called The Prescription Shop, in Winnipeg. With the company being one of the first in the suddenly-growing Canadian internet mail-order pharmacy industry, Thorkelson was hailed as an "internet pharmacy pioneer."

In addition to Thorkelson, several other fellow graduates of the University of Manitoba, class of 1991, also ventured into Manitoba's lucrative internet pharmacy industry as well. Right after graduation, Thorkelson and fellow classmate Daren Jorgenson scrapped together $7,500 each to purchase a pharmacy in Winnipeg's North End. They went their separate ways by 1994, creating their own new companies that sold prescription drugs online— mostly to Americans.

== Illegal importation ==
On 14 February 2012, the pharmaceutical company Hoffmann-La Roche and its U.S. biotech unit Genentech announced that counterfeits of the cancer drug Avastin had been distributed in the United States. The U.S. Food and Drug Administration (FDA) also named Kristjan Thorkelson, Canada Drugs' founder, in the investigation. CanadaDrugs.com, however, issued a statement insisting that it has no connected to the Avastin case because the company does not sell that drug. Meanwhile, in 2013, American Paul Bottomley pleaded guilty in connection with the case.

In November 2014, United States authorities charged the six Canadian men with smuggling goods into the United States, conspiracy and international money laundering: Winnipeggers Kristjan Thorkelson, Thomas Haughton, Ronald Sigurdson, Darren Chalus, and Troy Nakamura; and B.C. resident James Trueman. Thorkelson is Canada Drugs' founder; Haughton, Thorkelson's brother-in-law, owned several drug distribution companies in Barbados and the United Kingdom; Sigurdson was listed as a chief financial officer for Canada Drugs; and Chalus and Nakamura were managers of drug sales for several of the companies. Another man, Ram Kamath, was also named in the Canada Drugs charges but had his single charge of smuggling dropped in 2015 in exchange for his cooperation with authorities.

The indictment linked CanadaDrugs.com to the distribution of two lots of counterfeit cancer medications—Avastin and Altuzan (the Turkish version of the drug)—which had no active ingredients, to medical practices in the United States. It alleged that the company attempted to conceal the issue rather than reporting the supply chain breach to the FDA.

Health Canada suspended CanadaDrugs.com's Drug Establishment Licence in 2014, disabling the company from selling prescription drugs to pharmacies until the department's concerns were addressed. Following a Health Canada "good manufacturing practice" inspection, that licence was reinstated on 3 August 2016.

In 2015, RCMP officers raided the offices of CanadaDrugs.com in Winnipeg, resulting in assets in one bank account being seized.

In 2015, U.S. government indicted Canada Drugs for the felony charges of importing counterfeit drugs and other unapproved pharmaceuticals into the United States between 2009 and 2012. U.S. prosecutors accused the men—as well as the company and affiliated companies in the United Kingdom and Barbados—of having made at least $78 million through illegal imports. Prosecutors accused its U.K. affiliate, River East Supplies, of falsifying customs documents to hide the product. The case was handled in Montana, where Canada Drugs bought another company in 2009 for its drug inventory and customer list.

In 2017, the six men were arrested in Manitoba and British Columbia under Canada's Extradition Act on June 14 and 15, respectively. They were subsequently released on bail. At this time, CanadaDrugs.com was still operating and was licensed by the College of Pharmacists of Manitoba.

On 13 April 2018, CanadaDrugs.com was sentenced to 5 years probation and to pay $34 million in fines and forfeitures. The company and two overseas subsidiaries agreed to plead guilty to introducing misbranded drugs into interstate commerce; the subsidiaries also agreed to plead guilty to selling counterfeit drugs. Thorkelson, agreed to plead guilty to knowing about and concealing a felony crime. He was sentenced to six months house arrest, five years probation, and a $250,000 fine.

CanadaDrugs.com was required to surrender the domain names for the websites it used to illegally sell drugs to Americans, and cease operations on 13 July 2018.

== See also ==
- Pharmaceutical industry in Canada
- Canadian International Pharmacy Association
- Consumer import of prescription drugs, Canada to United States
- List of pharmacies, Canada
