= USHAŞ =

Turkish state owned healthcare company

- Company type: Public Company
- Industry: Health care Medical tourism Medical device
- Founded: 2019
- Headquarters: Ankara, Turkey
- Website: ushas.com.tr

USHAŞ (Turkish: USHAŞ, acronym: Uluslararası Sağlık Hizmetleri Anonim Şirketi, International Health Services Inc.), USHAŞ A.Ş. is a Turkish state owned healthcare company headquartered in Ankara, Turkey. The company was established in 2019 by Turkish Ministry of Health with the decree-law number 663 to promote and regulate medical tourism in Turkey.

== Info ==
The company could be seem as the equivalent of the institutions established by the different states worldwide to develop health tourism such as; Korea Health Industry Development Institute in South Korea, Malaysia Healthcare Travel Council in Malaysia and Dubai Health Authority in United Arab Emirates. Morevover, USHAŞ signs cooperation agreements with the governments or state owned companies to expand medical trade and cooperation mutually. USHAŞ's establishment was cited as Turkey's most powerful government entrepreneurship step in medical tourism area.

According to establishment law, the most important duties of USHAŞ are;

- Promote Turkey's health system in international area
- Carry out intermediary activities on behalf of both public and private hospitals
- Take initiatives for the resolution of complaints and disputes and to take preventive measures
- Carry out activities for healthcare education
- Provide consultancy on PPP models, health systems and financing and to share Turkey's experiences in coordination with Ministry of Health
- Open and operate health institutions abroad
- Supply medicines, medical devices and consumables.

== Fight against COVID-19 ==
USHAŞ also made an important contribution to Turkey's fight against COVID-19 with its fast purchasing and supplying processes at the beginning of pandemic, when protective materials were scarce and their prices were very high. The company became the financier of Biyovent ICU Ventilator, which is the Turkey's first domestic and national medical device, and played a very important role in the commercialization of this device.

The company became the top exporter in Turkey, in the medical device category in 2020, with its turnover mainly consisting of the sales revenues of the ventilator.

The role of USHAŞ in the fight against COVID-19 and its contribution to the capacity building in critical products such as personal protective equipments, diagnostic kits and ventilators has been shown by UNDP as a role model for less-developed countries. During the first wave of COVID-19 pandemics Turkey helped the United Kingdom by donating 250,000 pieces of personal protective equipment via USHAŞ.
