= Acuitas Therapeutics =

Canadian biotechnology company

Acuitas Therapeutics Inc.
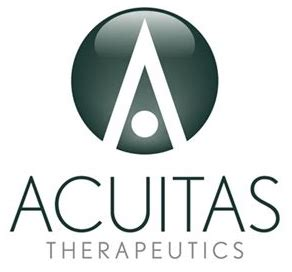
- Formerly: AlCana Technologies
- Type: Private
- Industry: Biotechnology; Pharmaceutical
- Founded: February 2009; 17 years ago
- Founder: Thomas Madden; Pieter Cullis; Michael Hope
- Headquarters: Vancouver, Canada
- Website: acuitastx.com

Acuitas Therapeutics Inc. is a Canadian biotechnology company based in Vancouver, British Columbia. The company was established in February 2009 to specialize in the development of delivery systems for nucleic acid therapeutics based on lipid nanoparticle (LNP) technology, a key component of the mRNA vaccines deployed for COVID-19.

== History ==
=== Inex Pharmaceuticals ===
Pieter Cullis was among several scientists experimenting with liposomes in the early 1980s. Cullis discovered he could load cancer drugs into liposomes, inspiring him and several colleagues at the University of British Columbia to form Inex Pharmaceuticals in 1992. One of Inex's co-founders was Thomas Madden, a biochemist from the United Kingdom.

=== Tekmira Pharmaceuticals ===
To improve the prospects of successfully advancing gene therapy techniques, Cullis developed and patented a new form of lipid nanoparticle designed to deliver genetic material to recipient cells. From 1994 onward, a series of patents were filed describing the technology Cullis and his colleagues created, including the addition of a chemical called polyethylene glycol (PEG) to further increase the LNP's ability to pass into cells.

Several spinoff companies emerged based on the research and intellectual property, including Protiva Biotherapeutics (which focused on gene therapies based on RNAi). In 2001, Inex was developing topotecan with GlaxoSmithKline, and by 2004 was in the research stage of preparing their own targeted cancer vaccine program. However, Cullis left the company after the Food and Drug Administration declined to approve their chemotherapy products. Inex then downsized and rebranded to Tekmira Pharmaceuticals. This led to $28.5 million in funding from “large biotechnology companies” for further development of anti-cancer drugs and RNA therapeutics for other diseases.

=== AlCana and Acuitas ===
Madden, Cullis and Michael Hope then founded AlCana Technologies in February 2009, later changing its name to Acuitas Therapeutics. With early financial support from the National Research Council Canada's Industrial Research Assistance Program (NRC IRAP), the company spent several years establishing its research and development capabilities and building out its staff. This led to its development of a viable lipid nanoparticle platform that showed promise for use in a variety of medical applications including chemotherapy, gene therapy and genetic vaccines. By 2012, the company had decided to focus on LNP development for the delivery of mRNA.

The Natural Research Council Canada awarded Acuitas a $173,020 grant in September 2013 and a $498,640 grant in February 2015 to continue their research and development.

In April 2016, Acuitas entered into a development and option agreement with German biotechnology company CureVac to jointly develop a product incorporating Acuitas' LNP technology with CureVac's mRNA materials. The encapsulated mRNA product described under the agreement was commissioned for use in in vitro and animal testing for pre-clinical trials of a vaccine candidate. Acuitas also worked on developing an mRNA vaccine against rabies.

=== COVID-19 ===
According to president and CEO Thomas Madden, Acuitas began working towards a COVID-19 vaccine in February 2020. The company also partnered with CureVac and Imperial College London for their own vaccine trials. Madden noted that the mRNA vaccine platform would allow for rapid development of updated vaccines in case the SARS-CoV-2 virus evolved beyond the immunity generated by the initial formulation, though additional clinical testing would still be required. He also stated that the Pfizer–BioNTech COVID-19 vaccine would stop the spread of the virus and infection in vaccinated individuals.

On December 9, 2020, Acuitas released a statement celebrating Health Canada's approval of Pfizer and BioNTech's BNT162b2 COVID-19 vaccine, stating they had “made history” due to their collaboration through the LNP delivery system. As a privately held company, Acuitas doesn't publicly publish its earnings.

=== Gene-editing therapies ===
Acuitas entered a long-term partnership with Science World in January 2022. In April 2022, Acuitas completed an agreement with Korean biotechnology company GC Biopharma to develop vaccines and therapeutics using their joint LNP-mRNA platform. In June 2022, Acuitas donated $25,000 to the Brain Tumour Foundation of Canada to create the Frazer Anderson Pediatric Research Grant. The company entered an agreement with genetic editing company Arbor Biotechnologies in August 2022 to target rare liver diseases, combining Acuitas' LNP technology with Arbor's CRISPR gene editing capabilities.

In June 2023, Bayer announced it had entered a partnership with Acuitas to use its lipid nanoparticles to deliver in vivo gene editing products to the liver.

On May 15, 2025, multiple sources reported that Acuitas lipid nanoparticles had been used to deliver a personalized CRISPR gene-editing therapy designed to treat a baby with a rare genetic disease, representing the first time CRISPR technology has been successfully used as a "bespoke" therapeutic for a single patient. The FDA-approved therapy, which was developed by a team of researchers at the Children's Hospital of Philadelphia, University of Pennsylvania, and the Innovative Genomics Institute, and included RNA manufactured by Danaher companies Aldevron and Integrated DNA Technologies (IDT), was customized to the child's individual DNA; specifically it aimed to address a gene mutation causing severe carbamoyl phosphate synthetase 1 (CPS1) deficiency.

In 2026, Acuitas acquired a majority stake in RNA Technologies and Therapeutics, who are based in Montreal.

== Organization ==
=== Partners ===
Acuitas has partnered with several pharmaceutical companies and universities to collaboratively advance specific product candidates, as well as to support the broader development of the personalized medicine sector. It is a member of BIOTECanada, a biotechnology industry association, and a sponsor of Life Sciences British Columbia. It has participated in research published by the University of Pennsylvania, Mount Sinai Health System, Chulalongkorn University, Thomas Jefferson University, and BioNTech.

Acuitas is a sponsor of the Vancouver-based Student Biotechnology Network.

=== Ownership ===
Rumours circulated in early 2022 that Prime Minister Justin Trudeau owned a 40% stake in Acuitas, either directly or through the Trudeau Foundation. This was refuted by the Office of the Prime Minister, CEO Thomas Madden and co-founder Pieter Cullis.
