= Border trade =

Purchasing goods across country's borders

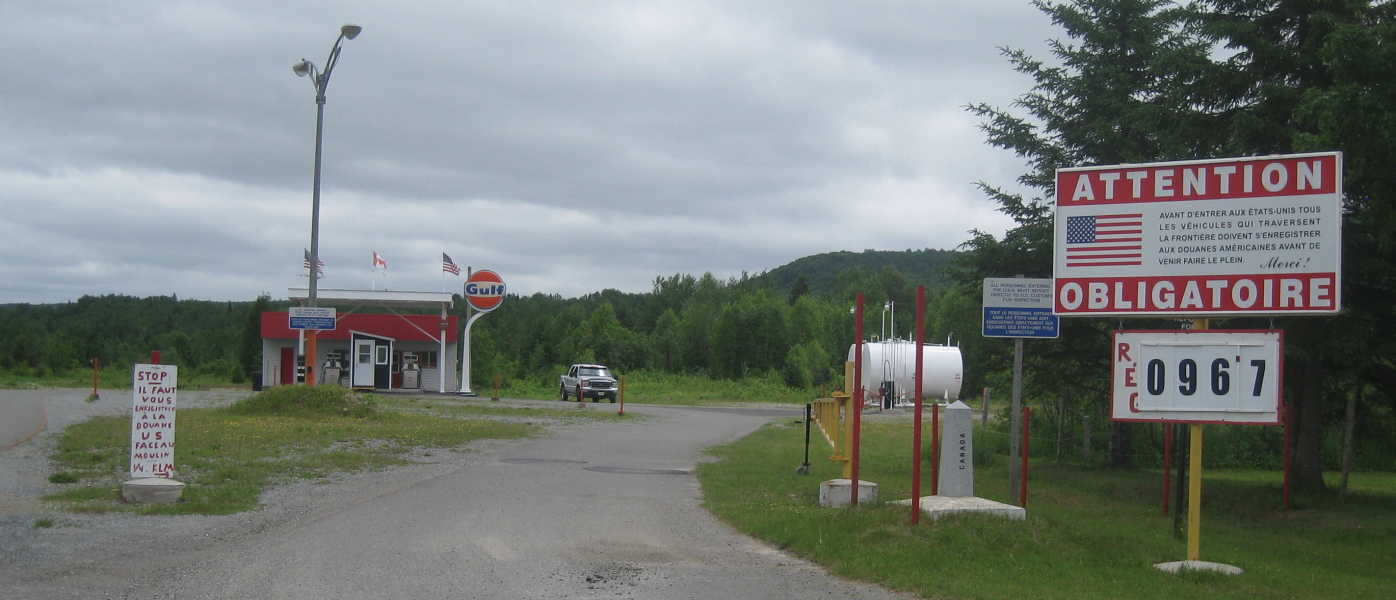
A gas station in Estcourt Station, Maine, caters to border shoppers from across the border with Canada. The sign says "Attention/Compulsory. Before entering the United States all vehicles crossing the border must register with American customs before coming to refuel"

Border trade (also cross-border shopping), in general, refers to the flow of goods and services across the border between different jurisdictions. In this sense, border trade is a part of the normal trade that flows through the ordinary export/import legal and logistical frameworks of nations and smaller jurisdictions. However, border trade specifically refers to the increase in trade in areas where crossing borders is relatively easy and where products are significantly less expensive on one side of the border than the other – often because of significant variations in taxation levels on goods. Common items involved in border trade include alcohol, tobacco, medication, recreational drugs, automobiles, automotive fuel, groceries, furniture and clothing.

As well as border trade across land or sea borders, air travel with a low-cost carrier can be worthwhile for an international trip for the same purpose, although baggage restrictions can limit the effective savings to those for small high-value goods.

Where border trade is done for tax evasion, it forms part of the underground economy of both jurisdictions.

== By region ==
=== Europe ===
Typical examples of this are the borders between Ukraine and Russia, between Norway and Denmark/Sweden/Finland/Russia/Estonia and between Denmark and Germany/Switzerland. For instance, the excise tax on alcohol is lower in Estonia than in Finland and Sweden; thus it is common to buy large volumes of alcohol when returning from Estonia: there are shops in Tallinn harbour that cater specifically to tourists. In Finland, the best-selling Alko shop in proportion to local population is on the border to Norway, since even if the alcohol tax is high in Finland, it is lower than the one in Norway (and was lowered in order to decrease border trade with Estonia).

Border trading exists between Lithuania and Poland, as buying food is cheaper in Poland than in Lithuania.

Border trading exists between Northern Ireland and the Republic of Ireland; during the 2008 financial crisis, when the euro rose against the British pound, so many from the Republic visited Newry—with lines of traffic four miles long—that the phenomenon became known as the "Newry effect". One in four households in the Republic in counties as far as Galway, four hours away from the border, shopped for groceries in Northern Ireland. Petrol is cheaper in the Republic, and groceries, furniture and clothing are cheaper in Northern Ireland.

Between the United Kingdom and France/Belgium, the booze cruise is a trip made specifically, or at least largely, to purchase cheaper alcohol and tobacco, and also goods offering different rates of VAT: laundry detergent, perhaps surprisingly, is a common purchase. Similarly, there is an important number of French purchasers buying tobacco and alcohol in Spanish border towns such as Le Perthus. In Spain, these products are a third cheaper than in France. During summer, around 70,000 visitors cross the Spanish border daily to buy such products, occasioning severe traffic jams. Nearby Andorra, with a low VAT (4%), is also extremely popular with French customers residing in the area.

There is a significant amount of border trade in marijuana between the Netherlands, where cannabis is essentially legal, and surrounding countries such as Belgium, Germany, and France.

A more legal example of the Netherlands is the Limburg province, where citizens occasionally take trips to Germany and Belgium to buy commodities like: medicinal products, handcrafted furniture, fresh produce, alcoholic beverages or home appliances for lower prices due to the VAT. This is very easy as there are no border controls due to the Schengen Agreement. It is fully legal to buy products for their own need over the border in the EU, if VAT is paid when purchasing, except from some low-VAT areas.

Residents of Switzerland and Liechtenstein who are non-EU residents can purchase many items in nearby Germany from anything from two to seven times the price they would pay for the same products in their own countries. Austria is also somewhat cheaper than Switzerland. Residents of Switzerland usually qualify for a tax refund on purchases made in all of the surrounding EU countries making cross border shopping even more attractive, particularly in Germany where there is no minimum-purchase requirement for claiming the tax back.

=== North America ===
Cross-border shopping between three countries in Canada, Mexico, and the United States has been robust. The North American Free Trade Agreement (NAFTA) has reduced barriers and tariffs, facilitating cross-border trade. Each day 2008, $2 billion of cross-border trade was conducted between Canada and the United States alone. Consumers take part in cross-border trading to broaden their product selection, gain access to a larger market place, or take advantage of currency volatility. Online commerce has taken on a more prominent role in recent years and gives consumers a convenient platform for cross-border shopping. However, additional border costs such as duties, brokerage and shipping are not always disclosed up front or even known to the retailer, leading to a situation where the final cost of an item can greatly exceed expectations. Dedicated cross-border shopping solutions such as Canada Post's Borderfree program existed to mitigate these problems with varied success. In the end, caution is necessary to determine the final cost of goods before purchase.

The consumer import of prescription drugs from Canada and Mexico into the United States can provide a large cost savings for the patient, and is sometimes even facilitated by insurance companies, and the quality of medicine in Canada is comparable to that in the United States

During the COVID-19 pandemic that began in 2020, the US–Canada and US–Mexico borders were closed to non-essential traffic, leaving merchants who normally catered to cross-border shoppers stranded with no access to their customers. Exclaves such as Point Roberts, Washington, were particularly hard hit. Specific business categories, such as parcel shops, tourism, fuel and dairy incurred severe losses in many border communities; both US–Canada and US–Mexico trade incurred multi-billion dollar impacts.

==== Between U.S. states and across city and county boundaries within states ====
Although not crossing a national boundary, residents of one state may often travel across a state line in order to shop for a variety of goods. In some cases, a larger city or metro area in one state may draw a population in from another state or people may travel outside of city limits to surrounding areas with lower taxes. In other cases, residents may cross boundaries to take advantage of more friendly legislation regarding restricted products, such as alcohol, tobacco, fireworks, firearms, gambling, etc. For example, a New York City resident may engage in illicit cigarette trade by purchasing products in a nearby state with lower taxes and re-selling them illegally in New York. Furthermore, states which have legalized recreational marijuana may experience a high-amount of out-of-state customers.

=== South America ===
Historically, trade between the Colombian-Venezuelan border consisted primarily of Colombian residents traveling to Venezuelan border towns to purchase fuel derived from Venezuelan oil and other items that were cheaper to obtain there. However, due to the crisis in Venezuela that began in 2013 and worsened in 2017, thousands of Venezuelan residents began to travel to Colombian border towns to mostly purchase basic necessity goods. This has also brought with it the appearance of a black market and smuggling throughout the entire Colombian-Venezuelan border space, in addition to some restrictions that have been imposed, such as the closure of the Venezuelan border with Colombia by Nicolás Maduro in August 2015.

In the Chilean border towns, it is common for Chilean residents to go to make purchases in the stores of their neighboring countries, as well as to purchase medical exams and other health services at a lower cost. Notable cases are the commercial relationship between Arica and Tacna, on the Chilean-Peruvian border. Likewise, despite the ruggedness of the relief when having to cross the Andes mountain range along the Argentinean-Chilean border, there is a high flow of trans-Andean buyers, being a notable case that of Chileans near the city of Mendoza. More to south, a similar situation occurs between the cities of Punta Arenas and Río Gallegos.

=== Asia ===
Many Singaporeans travel to Johor Bahru in Malaysia or Batam in Indonesia, to take advantage of price differences and differing product availability. The Singaporean government has a law that requires a car leaving Singapore to have the fuel tank filled by at least 75 percent, to prevent it from being filled with fuel from outside Singapore.

Shenzhen, on the border of mainland China with the special administrative region of Hong Kong, also benefits from border trade.

== See also ==
- Arbitrage
- Border checkpoint
- Border control
- Tax avoidance and tax evasion
