= Inter-A =

Inter-A is one of the options available to high school students in British Columbia, Canada. The program is based on developing leadership skills through co-operation, self-motivation and creativity, and is available to students in grades 8–12. Currently Inter-A is situated within Queen Elizabeth Secondary School which is part of School District 36 Surrey. It has a current student population of 150, with 6 teachers

== History ==
The Inter-A program was devised by Victor Vollrath and John Harper in the mid-1970s. The two teachers were sharing a classroom and teaching at opposite sides when they came to the realization that this way of teaching was highly productive for students. In fact, individual students with the skills and motivation to excel maintain this level of productivity to this day. Thus, Inter-A was born.

The program was originally located at Len Shepherd Secondary School. There it remained for many years, and the school was separated into Inter-A and the original Len Shepherd students evenly. Inter-A started off small, with thirty or fewer students ranging from grades 8-10 and eventually extended to grade 12 with the first grad class of 3 students graduating in 1992. Two of those grads are still married and 2 of the four grads of 1993 are still married in 2020.

Inter-A moved to Kwantlen Park Secondary School in 2002, opening the door to many more students. Victor Vollrath and John Harper retired as teachers a year later, but their ideas were passed off onto the new teachers.

The program moved to Queen Elizabeth Secondary School at the beginning of the 2017/18 school year due to overcrowding at Kwantlen. Inter-A is located on the third floor of the C-wing.

COVID-19 jeopardized much of the traditional layout of the program, with grades being separated from each other to fight the spread of the virus. This meant that many of the previously run co-grade projects were unable to happen. At the beginning of the 2021/22 school year, a slow transition back to the co-grade structure began.

== Academics ==
Inter-A students can be found in the hallways at different times of the day, which suggests that Inter-A has more freedom than its mainstream counterpart. It offers all the electives necessary for graduation and a place at any University or College in British Columbia or in Canada. The main differences are that Physical Education is demanded of the students until graduation, Fine Arts programs are chosen by the students, and the Inter-A Component.

The students are broken off into two categories: Intermediates (grades 8–9) and Seniors (10–12). There are six blocks in the day, as opposed to the standard four to accommodate the average high school attention span. There are also six units of six (occasionally seven) weeks per school year, with a report card at the end of each one, as opposed to the two-semester system. Inter-A uses Greek letters for its blocks instead of the A-D blocks Queen Elizabeth uses

=== Physical Education ===
Physical Education classes are divided into groups based on grades. Juniors, grades 8-9 do P.E. together and Seniors, grades 10-12 do it together. In these grades, students are given options they vote for, and attend until the unit ends. Usually bi-weekly, but sometimes every week, students participate in a 30-minute run along a route adjacent to the school grounds called 'Celebration of Cardio', though its unofficial name is 'endurance'. In previous years, the runners would collect popsicle sticks at designated stops along the route, but the physical popsicle sticks have been phased out in favor of students remembering the stops and tallying up the total in their head. The majority of students get anywhere from 8-11 sticks, equivalent to about 2 laps of the route, but some can get as many as 16 or 17. Students can run their own P.E. options, but teachers are the ones to usually run them. All marks are out of 100% but are then scaled down to 75%. The remaining 25% goes to the Inter-A Component, which is based on three criteria. The three criteria are: Community Service (10%), Choice (10%), and CPP (5%.)

=== Studio/Fine Arts ===
Fine Arts occurs once per week, usually on Wednesday. In return for only having one art block per week, the block consists of either the entire morning or entire afternoon. Like P.E. students can choose their own option and can run their own option. Each unit however usually has an overall theme such as movement or etc.

All marks are out of 100% but are then scaled down to 75%. The remaining 25% goes to the Inter-A Component, which is based on three criteria. The three criteria are: Community Service (10%), Choice (10%), and CPP (5%.)

=== Community service ===
Community Service, often shortened to Service, is a core part of the Inter-A program. Each student must complete 10 hours of service (changed to 15 in 2022) each unit. Service can range from tutoring a fellow student to helping out at your local temple or church. A log must be kept by each student and handed in at the end of each unit. Service makes up 10% of the grade of every subject. Most students go beyond the required hours, and awards are given out at the end of the year to the individuals with the most accumulative hours

==== Inside Service ====
Service is divided into two types. Inside Service are hours completed within the school or with the direct oversight of school administrators or teachers. This includes tutoring, cleaning of rooms, trash pickup, or building props for school games or plays. Many inside service options do not require an individual contract, as the leader will keep track of service.

==== Outside Service ====
Outside Service is all service gained outside of school. This can range from volunteering at local events or religious institutions, to picking up trash in a local park. A contract is required for all outside service, and must have the details of the supervisor. Only half of the needed hours can be earned doing outside service, but unlimited hours may be completed to add to the cumulative total.

=== CPP ===
Career and Personal Planning is a core part of the Inter-A program. Similar to Career Service Learning (CSL), the students set SMART goals for themselves using a template given out each unit, as well as goals for the whole year. Tri-weekly, they must complete an update on these goals, as well as an update on service hours, and get the CPP sheet signed by their parent/guardian and CPP teacher. A portfolio of the student's work is also gathered in this class as evidence of their academic progress. CPP marks make up 5% of every grade a student receives.

=== CSL ===
Career Service Learning is an integral part of Inter-A. Students plan leadership activities for both in school and out of the school environment. They must keep a weekly journal for the class, and talk about how their leadership is progressing. CSL makes up 5% of every grade.

=== Choice ===
Students in grades 8, and 9 can propose to run a choice seminar. A choice seminar is a student-led class, based on their knowledge of a particular subject, whether it be Spider-Man or motorcycles. The student will then be required to teach their peers about that particular subject, through visuals, demonstrations, group activities, or however else they see fit. Attending and handing in an assignment based on the leader's subject is part of an Inter-A student's choice work. Students can also attend other student's choice seminars and are required to attend a minimum of 8 seminars. Running a seminar can give the credit of attending 1-4 seminars, based on the quality of the presentation.

=== Math ===
For students in grades 8 through 10, Math is self paced. At the end of every chapter they must get their "Math Tracker" signed to signify they understand the concepts, then take the test. If they pass, they may go on to the next chapter. This age bracket sits in mixed age, mixed ability groups, called "Inter-A groups". The Inter-A group was made to teach group skills, leadership, and problem-solving. An Inter-A group should include even members of each gender, students of different ages/grades when possible, students of different skill levels and students who often do not work with each other.

Grades 11 and 12 students work with a teacher in a traditional setting, as opposed to the self-taught younger grades, as the subject matter is more difficult to grasp. However, once a week the younger students attend a Math Tutorial led by a teacher or a more experienced student. Calculus 12 is not offered in Inter-A at this time, but all three math streams (Apprenticeship and Workplace, Pre-Calculus, and Foundations of Math) are offered until the grade twelve level.

When COVID-19 began, the self-paced math model was removed from Inter-A, with a more tradition structure being adopted for the younger grades. There is a possibility that self-paced math could be re-introduced at some point in the future, but that is yet to happen.

=== Peer Tutoring ===
There is a number of peer tutoring options in Inter-A. COMAS (Celebration of Math after school) and COLAS (Celebration of Learning after school) are two service options that run regularly throughout the school year. To participate, there must be one student who is the tutor, and one who is the tutee. Both can earn service within the option. If you want to do peer tutoring on a day when those two options aren't running and want to earn service hours, then you must get a service contract signed by a teacher certifying the tutoring sessions. Tutoring outside of Inter-A is available through QE clubs and programs

=== Extracurricular activities ===
Students wishing to attend a post secondary art school are recommended to attend a specialized high school whose focus is more art-based. That is not to say that Inter-A children cannot participate in other school events; sports, theater and all clubs are open to members of Inter-A and Queen Elizabeth students.

Ultimate Frisbee is one of the most popular sports within the program, and many students participate both in school teams and Ultimate clubs like Vortex. One of the Inter-A teachers, Christopher Wakelin, is the coach of the QE ultimate team, which adds to its popularity within the program.

An Inter-A play is often run annually. "The Grounding of Donnie Greener", written by Roger Blenman, and was a success.

Inter-A has several Destination Imagination teams. The teams often place second or better in Provincial Tournaments, and several have gone on to score highly at the World Finals in Knoxville, Tennessee.

Math Club is available after school some days for students who struggle, need service, or just love math and need somewhere to do it.

A "Herd" is when the Inter-A students come together for an information session in one of the three Inter-A classrooms.

== Facilities ==
Inter-A is made up of 8 rooms. C301-302, C303, C305-306, C307-308 and C228. C301-302, nicknamed 'the big room', is the largest and the size of 2 1/2 regular sized classrooms. C305-306 is nicknamed 'the blue room' for its coloured furniture. C307-308 is nicknamed 'the art room' for being the room where most of the art supplies are stored, and its special drawing tables. C303 is a half-classroom that serves as a teachers room, and C228 is Inter-A's science lab, and is disconnected from the rest of the classrooms. Inter-A students are also free to use the QE library, cafeteria and gyms.

== Student and Parent Leadership ==
=== Homeroom Leaders ===
Each unit, the three homerooms elect two representatives (on very rare occasions a homeroom leader runs by themselves) to act as student leaders. They complete attendance and convey announcements. In homeroom elections all students are able to vote

==== Table Leaders ====
Each table elects one of their member to represent them during meetings. This individual is able to vote on who sits on the executive council. If there are multiple table leaders, only one is able to vote in each election. Table leaders are able to earn up 7 hours of service if they hand in an end of unit reflection.

=== Inter-A Executive Council ===
Inter-A has its own executive council, consisting of a co-chair, a secretary, a fundraising representative, a social media representative, homeroom leaders and a representative for the junior grades. They discuss important matters regarding the program with the teachers and the Inter-A student society. They are elected by the table leaders representing each table group. To be social media or fundraising representative you must have been part of the social media or fundraising team the previous unit. The teams are students who aid the main representative in organizing and executing plans

=== Inter-A Student Society ===
The Inter-A student society is an organization of the parents of students that helps co-ordinate and organize events like Retreat. They communicate with the executive council and the teachers.

== Application ==
=== Presentation Team ===
Presentation Team is a group of Inter-A students, usually seniors, who travel to schools across Surrey and advertise the program to grade 7 students. Grade 7s who are interested can then apply to be toured.

=== Touring ===
Touring consists of being shown around the program by a grade 8 student, and experiencing what a typical day would look like. Touring runs throughout late January to February, and if the touree feels like Inter-A is a fit for them, the next step is an interview with the teachers.

== In-Program Events ==
=== School at Night ===
School at Night is an annual project that is program wide. Students are put into groups and given a topic to make a presentation on. Typically there is around 2–3 weeks of preparation before the project is due. On a chosen date in mid November, the school day is rescheduled from its normal time to 3-8 pm. The school at night consists of normal academic blocks, a dinner break and the presentation time. Students are free to roam and view other group's presentations as long as at least one in their group remains at their project. It was cancelled for two years due to COVID-19, but the 2022/23 School at Night happened on November 9, 2022, with the topic being 'art that changed the world'.

=== Seasonal Cafes ===
Cafes are seasonal performances put on by students to showcase their talents. They are most often labelled by the season they take place in, i.e. 'Winter Cafe', but can also be associated with a major holiday that is coming up like Christmas. Cafes usually take place during lunch blocks, and operate similarly to talent shows. They care called cafes due to the homemade/bought food that is sold alongside the show, though that isn't always the case

=== Crafternoons ===
Afternoons that are focused on arts and crafts through student led options. Usually multiple a year

=== Square Dancing ===
A program wide PE unit focused on square and line dancing is a tradition within Inter-A. Normally running from December to February, the students are divided into groups, with the Grade 12s, 10s and half of the Grade 8s in one group, and the 11s, 9s and other half of the Grade 8s in the other. The dances vary from easy two step circle dances to complicated square dances that require co-ordination with a group of 9 other people

=== Festive and seasonal cards ===
It is an annual event in Inter-A to have a secret Santa-esque project towards the end of the year. All students and teachers participate, and must make a card for the person that they draw. In previous years, participants have made large vehicles such as tanks or star destroyers for their projects, but it has been changed recently to make it a criterion that it must fit inside a large-size envelope. The cards are given out on the last day before winter break.

=== Apple Awards ===
Apple Awards are non-serious awards given out to students and teachers at the end of each school year by their peers. They are named 'apple awards' for the tradition of handing out a locally-grown apple to each student when they received their award. This was temporarily put on hold due to COVID-19, but the tradition was brought back in the 2022/2023 school year.

== Field trips ==
Field trips in Inter-A can be divided into three categories:

=== Day trips ===
The small field trip in Inter-A is a typical field trip experience. Inter-A students have been to the Vancouver Aquarium, Chinatown, Geneskool, Bard on the Beach, and Science World. Day trips are used as a way to give students a real-world application for work done in a classroom.

=== Overnight trips ===
Overnight trips like the annual Retreat provide a longer bonding experience between students and teachers and the development of leadership skills

=== Overseas ===
Every second year the Inter-A program offers a trip overseas for two to three weeks. Previous destinations have included Italy, France, Australia, Greece, England and other countries.

== Retreat ==
The annual Retreat happens about 2 weeks into the school year and consists of 3 days and 2 nights of overnight camping. It is program wide and usually happens at Camp Sunrise on the Sunshine Coast. For the 2015/16 school year it took place at Rockridge Canyon in Princeton, British Columbia. The Retreat is an opportunity for students and teachers, and is especially helpful for grade 8 students to integrate with the rest of the program. The Retreat did not run in 2020 and 2021 due to COVID-19

=== The Big Game ===
The Big Game, as per its name, is the biggest event during Retreat. On the afternoon of the second day, all students in the program participate in a group game with a set of rules and objectives created by Roger Blenman. The game usually lasts around 2 hours

=== Power 10 ===
Power 10 is an activity designed by the grade 10 class every Retreat for the grade 8s and 9s. Starting as an activity run by the grade 9s, it was changed to one run by the grade 10s later. A Power 10 normally consists of rotational activities with the background of an overall story. It runs concurrent with a CSL block for the grade 11s and 12s

=== Student Run Activities ===
Retreat has a variety of student run activities. As Inter-A is a leadership program the majority of activities are student run, with a teacher sponsor. Ice-breakers, PE, Art and morning activities are all mostly run by pupils, and it provides them with valuable experience in leadership

=== The Morning Hike ===
The hike to Soamkes Peak on the first morning of the Retreat is a long tradition. Students who want to go on the hike must wake up earlier than the others and return in time for breakfast.

== Achievements and awards ==
The Inter-A Program has been regarded as one of the most notable secondary institutes in British Columbia. The graduating students from Inter-A are often over represented in scholarships and awards. With the skills developed in Inter-A many of the graduates go on to university level education with high exam scores. Both founders of the program, Vic Vollrath and John Harper, have received national recognition awards for their excellence in teaching. Inter-A has placed its parent schools amongst the top public schools in British Columbia within recent years based on Grade 12 provincial exam marks.
