= Malaysia Healthcare Travel Council =

- Formation: 2005
- Type: Government-Linked, Non-Profit
- Headquarters: Kuala Lumpur, Malaysia
- Key people: YB Datuk Seri Dr. Dzulkefly Ahmad, Chairman YBhg. Datuk Seri Hj. Hasnol Zam Zam Hj. Ahmad, Director YBhg. Dato’ Sri Dr. MahatharBin Abd. Wahab, Director YBhg. Dato’ Shaharuddin Bin Abu Sohot, Director YBrs. En. Ahmad Shahizam Mohd Shariff, Independent Director YBrs. Pn. Eunice Chan, Independent Director YBhg. Datuk Dr. Kuljit Singh, Independent Director
- Parent organization: Ministry of Health Malaysia (MOH)
- Website: https://www.malaysiahealthcare.org

The Malaysia Healthcare Travel Council (MHTC) was established by the Malaysian Ministry of Health in 2005. MHTC is responsible in advocating for the medical tourism industry in Malaysia. In 2011, MHTC was incorporated as an independent entity to coordinate Malaysia's healthcare travel sector.

== History ==
In 2003, a small unit under the Corporate Division of the Ministry of Health was established, which includes experts knowledgeable in healthcare to advise and guide the Ministry of International Trade and Industry (“MITI”) and MATRADE representatives in showcasing Malaysia's healthcare travel industry. This unit grew into the “Health Services” unit under the Corporate Services Division, forming a microcosm of what is known as MHTC today.

MHTC was incorporated under the National Key Economic Area (“NKEA”) in 2011, with an aim to enable the agency to fulfil its role as the promoting and facilitating arm of the Ministry of Health.

In 2018, due to the change in the government, MHTC was shifted under the purview of the Ministry of Finance.

The Global Market Report 2018 placed Malaysia as the world's top healthcare travel destination by volume. In 2019, Malaysia welcomed over 1.2 million medical tourists. Over the past decade, some of the top countries of arrival are Australia, Bangladesh, China, India, Indonesia, Japan, Philippines, Singapore, United Kingdom and United States of America.

The top treatments sought by healthcare travellers over the past decade are Cardiology, Fertility, Oncology, Orthopaedics, Neurology, Premium Health Screening and Dental. A 2020 study ranked the country in the top 10 wellness destinations.

== Promotional Efforts ==
In 2026, MHTC launched the Malaysia Year of Medical Tourism 2026 (MYMT2026) to promote Malaysia as a healthcare travel destination. In conjunction with the broader Visit Malaysia 2026 campaign by Tourism Malaysia, the campaign includes international promotions, industry events, media engagements and partnerships across key markets, showcasing Malaysia's healthcare services and the wider patient experience. It also aims to support the continued growth of Malaysia's healthcare travel industry.
