= Pieter Cullis =

Canadian researcher

Pieter R. Cullis FRS FRSC OBC OC
- Born: 12 May 1946 (age 80); Barnard Castle, UK
- Education: University of British Columbia (BSc, Physics, 1964–1967) University of British Columbia (PhD, Physics, 1967–1972) University of Oxford (Postdoc, Biochemistry, 1973–1976) Utrecht University (Postdoc, Biochemistry, 1977)
- Known for: Lipid nanoparticles
- Scientific career
- Thesis: Electron paramagnetic resonance of phosphorus doped silicon in the intermediate impurity concentration range (1972)
- Doctoral advisor: J.R. Marko
- Website: www.liposomes.ca

Pieter Rutter Cullis FRS FRSC OBC OC (born 12 May 1946 in Barnard Castle, UK) is a Canadian physicist and biochemist known for his contributions to the field of lipid nanoparticles (LNP). Cullis and co-workers have been responsible for fundamental advances in the development of nanomedicines employing lipid nanoparticle (LNP) technology for cancer therapies, gene therapies and vaccines. This work has contributed to five drugs that have received clinical approval by the US Food and Drug Agency (FDA), the European Medicines Agency, and Health Canada.

Cullis has also co-founded eleven biotechnology companies that now employ over 400 people, has published over 400 scientific articles (h-index 138) and is an inventor on over 100 patents. Companies he has co-founded include Acuitas Therapeutics, Integrated Nanotherapeutics, Precision NanoSystems, and NanoVation Therapeutics. He has also co-founded and has been the Founding Scientific Director of two National Centre of Excellence networks: the Centre for Drug Research and Development (now AdMare) in 2004 and the NanoMedicines Innovation Network in 2019. These not-for-profit networks are aimed at translating basic research in the life sciences into commercially viable products.

Two recently approved drugs that are enabled by LNP delivery systems devised by Cullis, members of his UBC laboratory, and colleagues in the companies he has co-founded deserve special emphasis. The first is Onpattro which was approved by the US FDA in August 2018 to treat the previously fatal hereditary condition transthyretin-induced amyloidosis (hATTR). Onpattro is the first RNAi drug to receive regulatory approval. The second is Comirnaty, the COVID-19 mRNA vaccine developed by Pfizer/BioNTech that has received regulatory approval in many jurisdictions including Canada, the US, the UK and Europe. Comirnaty has played a major role in containing the global COVID-19 pandemic with approximately 6B doses administered worldwide in 2021 and 2022.

== Research interests ==
Cullis's research interests concern the roles of lipids in biological membranes and the development of nanomedicines using lipid nanoparticle (LNP) technology. His studies on the roles of lipids focus on two areas. The first concerns the ability of membrane lipids to adopt non-bilayer structures and the roles of such structures in processes such as membrane fusion. The second area focuses on transport across bilayer lipid systems induced by trans-bilayer ion gradients. His interests in nanomedicines first concern the design and synthesis of LNP delivery systems containing small molecule drugs, particularly drugs used in cancer chemotherapy, with the aim of increasing potency and reducing toxicity by enhancing drug delivery to, and release at, sites of disease such as tumours. A second area involves using LNP technology to enable the therapeutic use of macromolecular genetic drugs such as small interfering RNA (siRNA) and messenger RNA (mRNA) for gene therapy, including gene editing. These efforts have led to five nanomedicines that have been approved for clinical use by regulatory agencies such as the US Food and Drug Agency (FDA), the European Medicines Agency and Health Canada (see Table below).

Two of these nanomedicines were recently approved and are of particular note. First is the drug Onpattro, a gene therapy that was approved (August 2018) by the FDA to treat hereditary amyloid transthyretin (hATTR) amyloidosis. Onpattro is the first-in-class RNAi-based drug to be approved by the FDA and employs an LNP delivery system developed in collaboration with Alnylam Pharmaceuticals (Boston), his laboratory at UBC and two spin-offs that he co-founded (Protiva/Arbutus and Acuitas Therapeutics). Onpattro delivers an siRNA to silence the TTR gene in the liver. A remarkable feature of Onpattro is that it is able to not only stop further progression of this hitherto untreatable disease (which usually leads to death within five years of diagnosis), but also to reverse the neuropathies and cardiovascular issues associated with hATTR. The second class of medicines are the mRNA COVID-19 vaccines that Acuitas developed with Pfizer/BioNTech and CureVac. The Pfizer/BioNTech COVID-19 mRNA vaccine BNT162b2 relies on an LNP delivery system developed by Acuitas. BNT162b2 (Comirnaty) was approved for emergency use (December 2020) by the US FDA and has subsequently been approved by the US, UK, Canada, Europe and many other countries worldwide. These approvals were made on the basis of a 95% efficacy in preventing COVID-19, together with an excellent safety profile. More than five billion doses of this vaccine were administered globally in 2021–22 and the vaccine has been credited with saving over six million lives in 2021 alone.

== Nanomedicine drugs ==
The following approved nanomedicine drugs have been co-developed by Cullis's laboratory at the University of British Columbia and by the companies he has co-founded (Inex Pharmaceuticals Corp, Protiva Biotherapeutics, Canadian Liposome Company, Acuitas Therapeutics).

Nanomedicine drug	Trade name	Indication	Status (2020)	Company
LNP Amphotericin	Abelcet	Fungal infections	Approved US, Europe – 1995	Enzon/Canadian Lipo Co
LNP Doxorubicin	Myocet	Metastatic breast cancer	Approved Europe, Canada – 2000	Cephalon/Canadian Lipo Co
LNP Vincristine	Marqibo	Acute lymphoblastic leukemia	Approved US – 2012	Spectrum Pharma/Inex
LNP siRNA TTR	Onpattro	Transthyretin-induced amyloidosis	Approved US, Europe – 2018	Alnylam/Acuitas
LNP mRNA SARS Cov 2	Comirnaty	COVID-19 mRNA vaccine	Approved US, Europe – 2021	Pfizer/BioNTech/Acuitas

== Research and professional experience ==
Institution/company	Title
UBC, Department of Biochemistry & Molecular Biology	Assistant Professor (1978); Associate Professor (1982); Professor (1985–present)
Lipex Biomembranes (now Evonik Canada)	Co-Founder (1985); Chairman (1985–2000)
Canadian Liposome Company	Co-Founder (1986); Director & President (1986–1991)
Northern Lipids (now Evonik Canada)	Co-Founder (1992); Director (1992–1996)
Inex Pharmaceuticals Corp (now GeneVant)	Co-Founder (1992); Director (1992–2007); VP Research (1992–2004)
Protiva Biotherapeutics (now Arbutus)	Co-founder (2001); Director & Chair, SAB (2001–2005)
Centre Drug Research & Development (now AdMare)	Co-founder (2004); Scientific Director (2004–2010)
Acuitas Therapeutics	Co-Founder (2009); Chairman (2009–2021)
Precision NanoSystems (now Cytiva)	Co-Founder (2010); Chairman (2010–2015)
Personalized Medicine Initiative	Co-Founder (2011); Chairman (2011–2017)
Life Sciences Institute, UBC	Director (2013–2017)
GenXys Health Care Systems	Co-Founder (2014); Director (2014–2016)
Mesentech	Co-Founder (2014); Director (2014–2019)
Molecular You Corporation	Co-Founder (2014); Chairman (2014–present)
AllerGen National Centre of Excellence	Director (2014–present); Chairman (2017–present)
Integrated NanoTherapeutics	Co-Founder (2015); Chairman (2015–2021)
NanoMedicines Innovation Network NCE	Founder (2019); Scientific Director & CEO (2019–2021)
NanoVation Therapeutics	Co-Founder (2020); Chairman (2020–present)

== Academic and professional awards ==
Start	End	Name of Award	Agency
1973	1976	MRC Postdoctoral Fellowship	Canadian Medical Research Council
1977	1977	EMBO Postdoctoral Fellowship	European Molecular Biology Organization
1978	1982	MRC Scholar	Medical Research Council of Canada
1983	1989	MRC Scientist	Medical Research Council of Canada
1986		Ayerst Award	Canadian Biochemical Society
1988		Jacob Biely Faculty Research Prize	University of British Columbia
1988		Killam Prize – Science	University of British Columbia
1991		Gold Medal for Health Sciences	BC Science Council
2000		Alec Bangham Award	International Liposome Society
2002		Award for Innovation and Achievement	BC Biotechnology Alliance
2004		Fellow of the Royal Society of Canada	Royal Society of Canada
2005		Alumni Award for Research	University of British Columbia
2005		Barre Award	University of Montreal
2010		CSPS Leadership Award	Canadian Society for Pharmaceutical Sciences
2011		Bill and Marilyn Webber Lifetime Achievement Award	University of British Columbia - Faculty of Medicine
2011		Prix Galien Canada Research Award	Prix Galien Canada
2012		Senior Faculty Award-Outstanding Contributions	University of British Columbia - Faculty of Medicine
2015		Milton Wong Leadership Award	Life Sciences BC
2016		Lifetime Achievement Award	Journal of Drug Targeting
2018		Fellow of the National Academy of Inventors	National Academy of Inventors, USA
2021		Founder's Award	Controlled Release Society, USA
2021		Harvey Prize	Technion, Israel
2021		Officer, Order of Canada	Governor General of Canada
2021		Prince Mahidol Award (Medicine)	Prince Mahidol Award Foundation, Thailand
2021		VinFuture Prize, Grand Prize	VinFuture Foundation, Vietnam
2022		Alumni Award of Distinction	University of British Columbia
2022		Bloom Burton Award	Bloom Burton & Co.
2022		Canada Gairdner International Award	Gairdner Foundation, Canada
2022		Global Impact Award	Life Sciences BC
2022		Governor General's Innovation Award	Rideau Hall Foundation, Canada
2022		Lipid Science Prize	Camurus Foundation, Sweden
2022		Tang Prize (Biopharmaceutical Science)	Tang Foundation, Taiwan
2022		Thudichum Life Award	Phospholipid Research Centre, Germany
2023		Bill and Marilyn Webber Lifetime Achievement Award	University of British Columbia - Faculty of Medicine
2023		Doctorate Honoris Causa	Ghent University, Belgium
2023		Fellow of the Royal Society	Royal Society, London
2023		Julia Levy Award	Society of Chemical Industry (SCI Canada)
2023		Killam Prize in Health Sciences	Killam Foundation, National Research Council, Canada
2023		Member, Order of British Columbia	Government of British Columbia
2023		Sultan Karim Medal of Excellence in Clinical Pharmacology	University of British Columbia - Faculty of Medicine
2024		Maurice-Marie Janot Award	Association de Pharmacie Galénique Industrielle, France
2024		Member, Canadian Medical Hall of Fame	Canadian Medical Hall of Fame
2025		Canada Medal	Society of Chemical Industry (SCI Canada)
2025		Scheele Award	Swedish Pharmaceutical Society, Sweden
2026		Lifetime Achievement Award	Oligonucleotide Therapeutics Society, USA
