= Medical tourism =

People traveling abroad to obtain medical treatment

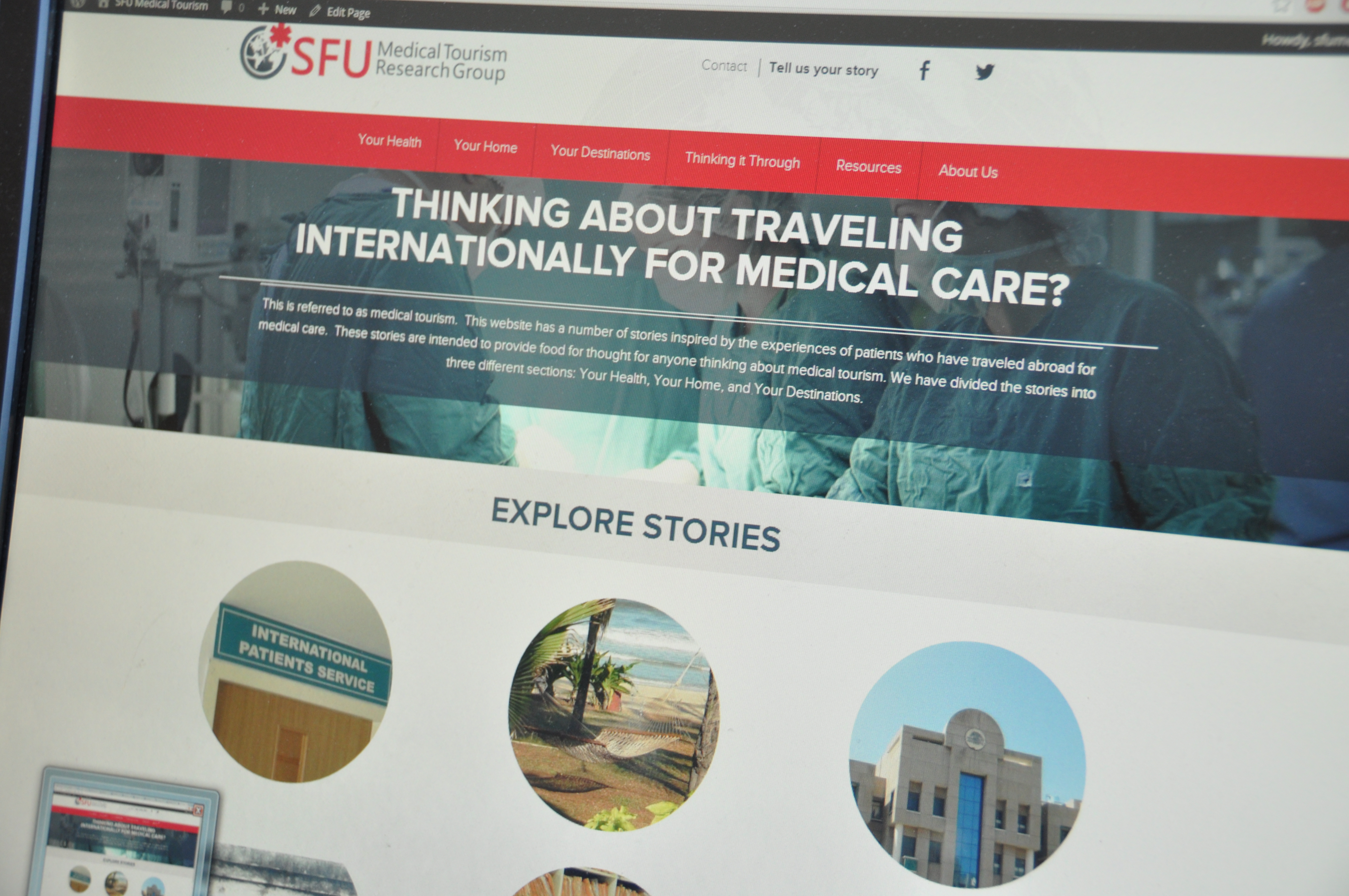
Medical tourism search website

Medical tourism is the practice of traveling abroad to obtain medical treatment. In the past, this usually referred to those who traveled from less-developed countries to major medical centers in highly developed countries for treatment unavailable at home. However, in recent years it may equally refer to those from developed countries who travel to developing countries for lower-priced medical treatments. With differences between the medical agencies, such as the Food and Drug Administration (FDA) or the European Medicines Agency (EMA), etc., which decide whether a drug is approved in their country or region, or not, the motivation may be also for medical services unavailable or non-licensed in the home country.

Medical tourism most often is for surgeries (cosmetic or otherwise) or similar treatments, though people also travel for dental tourism or fertility tourism. People with rare conditions may travel to countries where the treatment is better understood. However, almost all types of health care are available, including psychiatry, alternative medicine, convalescent care, and even burial services.

Health tourism is a wider term for travel that focuses on medical treatments and the use of healthcare services. It covers a wide field of health-oriented tourism ranging from preventive and health-conductive treatment to rehabilitational and curative forms of travel. Wellness tourism is a related field.

== History ==
The first recorded instance of people traveling for medical treatment dates back thousands of years to when Greek pilgrims traveled from the eastern Mediterranean to a small area in the Saronic Gulf called Epidauria. This territory was the sanctuary of the healing god Asklepios.

Spa towns and sanitaria were early forms of medical tourism. In 18th-century Europe patients visited spas because they were places with supposedly health-giving mineral waters, treating diseases from gout to liver disorders and bronchitis.

== Description ==
Factors that have led to the increasing popularity of medical travel include the high cost of health care, long wait times for certain procedures, the ease and affordability of international travel, and improvements in both technology and standards of care in many countries. The avoidance of waiting times is the leading factor for medical tourism from the UK, whereas in the US, the main reason is cheaper prices abroad. Furthermore, death rates even in the developed countries differ extremely.

Many surgical procedures performed in medical tourism destinations cost a fraction of the price they do in other countries. For example, in the United States, a liver transplant that may cost US$300,000, would generally cost about US$91,000 in Taiwan. A large draw to medical travel is convenience and speed. Countries that operate public health-care systems often have long wait times for certain operations, for example, an estimated 782,936 Canadian patients spent an average waiting time of 9.4 weeks on medical waiting lists in 2005. Canada has also set waiting time benchmarks for non-urgent medical procedures, including a 26-week waiting period for a hip replacement and a 16-week wait for cataract surgery.

In developed countries such as the United States, medical tourism has large growth prospects and potentially destabilizing implications. A forecast by Deloitte Consulting published in August 2008 projected that medical tourism originating in the US could jump by a factor of ten over the next decade. An estimated 750,000 Americans went abroad for health care in 2007, and the report estimated that 1.5 million would seek health care outside the US in 2008. The growth in medical tourism has the potential to cost US health care providers billions of dollars in lost revenue.

Manish Chandra, Co founder of Vaidam Health stated that " Medical tourism is a rapidly expanding sector within India's healthcare industry, offering immense potential. Over the years, a significant number of people have traveled across continents seeking medical care due to factors such as cost-effectiveness, faster and more efficient services, specialized healthcare, and advanced treatment options that may not be available in their home countries. Industry reports indicate that India's healthcare industry is projected to reach $280 billion by 2020, which will likely enhance the quality and scope of medical treatment offered by hospitals".

An authority at the Harvard Business School stated that "medical tourism is promoted much more heavily in the United Kingdom than in the United States".

Additionally, some patients in some First World countries are finding that insurance either does not cover orthopedic surgery (such as knee or hip replacement) or limits the choice of the facility, surgeon, or prosthetics to be used.

Popular medical travel worldwide destinations include: Canada, Cuba, Costa Rica, India, Israel, Jordan, Malaysia, Mexico, Singapore, South Korea, Taiwan, Thailand, Turkey, United States.

Among the most popular destinations for cosmetic surgery include: Brazil, Colombia, Costa Rica, Czech Republic, Dominican Republic, Egypt, Greece, Iran, India, Italy, Lebanon, Malaysia, Mexico, Poland, South Korea, Turkey and Thailand.

Some people travel for assisted pregnancy, such as in-vitro fertilization, or surrogacy, or freezing embryos for retro-production.

However, perceptions of medical tourism are not always positive. In places like the US, which has high standards of quality, medical tourism is viewed as risky. In some parts of the world, wider political issues can influence where medical tourists will choose to seek out health care.

Medical tourism providers have developed as intermediaries which unite potential medical tourists with surgeons, provider hospitals and other organizations. In some cases, surgeons from the United States have signed up with medical tourism providers to travel to Mexico to treat American patients. The hope is that using an American surgeon may alleviate concerns about going outside the country, and persuade self-insured American employers to offer this cost-effective option to their workers as a way to save money while still provide high-quality care. Companies that focus on medical value travel typically provide nurse case managers to assist patients with pre- and post-travel medical issues. They may also help provide resources for follow-up care upon the patient's return.

Circumvention tourism is also an area of medical tourism that has grown. Circumvention tourism is travel in order to access medical services that are legal in the destination country but illegal in the home country. This can include travel for fertility treatments that are not yet approved in the home country, abortion, and doctor-assisted suicide. Abortion tourism can be found most commonly in Europe, where travel between countries is relatively simple. Poland, a European country with highly restrictive abortion laws, has one of the highest rates of circumvention tourism, as did Ireland before abortion was made legal in 2018. In Poland especially, it is estimated that each year nearly 7,000 women travel to the UK, where abortion services are free through the National Health Service. There are also efforts being made by independent organizations and doctors, such as with Women on Waves, to help women circumvent laws in order to access medical services. With Women on Waves, the organization uses a mobile clinic aboard a ship to provide medical abortions in international waters, where the law of the country whose flag is flown applies.

Dental tourism is travel for cheaper dentistry or oral surgery. The same porcelain veneer made in a lab in Sweden can be as much as 2500 AUD in Australia, but only 1200 AUD in India. The price difference here is not explainable by reference to the material cost.

== International healthcare accreditation ==
International healthcare accreditation is the process of certifying a level of quality for healthcare providers and programs across multiple countries. International healthcare accreditation organizations certify a wide range of healthcare programs such as hospitals, primary care centers, medical transport, and ambulatory care services. There are a number of accreditation schemes available based in a number of different countries around the world.

The oldest international accrediting body is Accreditation Canada, formerly known as the Canadian Council on Health Services Accreditation, which accredited the Bermuda Hospital Board as soon as 1968. Since then, it has accredited hospitals and health service organizations in ten other countries. In the United States, the accreditation group Joint Commission International (JCI) was formed in 1994 to provide international clients education and consulting services. Many international hospitals today see obtaining international accreditation as a way to attract American patients.

Joint Commission International is a relative of the Joint Commission in the United States. Both are US-style independent private sector not-for-profit organizations that develop nationally and internationally recognized procedures and standards to help improve patient care and safety. They work with hospitals to help them meet Joint Commission standards for patient care and then accredit those hospitals meeting the standards.

A British scheme, QHA Trent Accreditation, is an active independent holistic accreditation scheme, as well as GCR.org which monitors the success metrics and standards of almost 500,000 medical clinics worldwide.

The different international healthcare accreditation schemes vary in quality, size, cost, intent and the skill and intensity of their marketing. They also vary in terms of cost to hospitals and healthcare institutions making use of them.

Increasingly, some hospitals are looking towards dual international accreditation, perhaps having both JCI to cover potential US clientele, and Accreditation Canada or QHA Trent. As a result of competition between clinics for American medical tourists, there have been initiatives to rank hospitals based on patient-reported metrics.

== Risks and criticism ==
Medical tourism carries some risks that locally provided medical care either does not carry or carries to a much lesser degree.

Some countries, such as South Africa and Thailand, have very different infectious disease-related epidemiology to Europe and North America. Exposure to unfamiliar diseases may post a risk for vulnerable individuals, particularly gastrointestinal diseases such as hepatitis A, amoebic dysentery, and paratyphoid). These illnesses may weaken a patient and complicate recovery, increasing susceptibility to other infections. However, in countries where a wider range of infectious diseases are commonly encountered, doctors may be more open to the possibility of considering diagnoses such as HIV, tuberculosis, and typhoid, while there are cases in the Western world where patients were consistently misdiagnosed for years because such diseases are perceived to be "rare" in the West.

The quality of post-operative care can also vary dramatically, depending on the hospital and country, and may be different from US or European standards. Also, traveling long distances soon after surgery can increase the risk of complications. Long flights and decreased mobility associated with window seats can predispose one towards developing deep vein thrombosis and potentially a pulmonary embolism. Other vacation activities can be problematic as well — for example, scars may become darker and more noticeable if they are sunburned while healing.

Also, health facilities treating medical tourists may lack an adequate complaints policy to deal appropriately and fairly with complaints made by dissatisfied patients.

Differences in healthcare provider standards around the world have been recognized by the World Health Organization, and in 2004 it launched the World Alliance for Patient Safety. This body assists hospitals and government around the world in setting patient safety policy and practices that can become particularly relevant when providing medical tourism services.

Patients traveling to countries with less stringent surgical standards may be at higher risk for complications. If complications arise, the patient may be required to remain in the foreign country longer than initially planned. Alternatively, if they have already returned home, access to appropriate follow-up care may be limited.

Patients sometimes travel to another country to obtain medical procedures that doctors in their home country refuse to perform because they believed that the risks of the procedure outweigh the benefits. Such patients may have difficulty getting insurance (whether public or private) to cover follow up medical costs should the feared complications indeed arise.

=== Legal issues ===
Receiving medical care abroad may subject medical tourists to unfamiliar legal issues. The limited nature of litigation in various countries is a reason for accessibility of care overseas. While some countries currently presenting themselves as attractive medical tourism destinations provide some form of legal remedies for medical malpractice, these legal avenues may be unappealing to the medical tourist. Should problems arise, patients might not be covered by adequate personal insurance or might be unable to seek compensation via malpractice lawsuits. Hospitals and/or doctors in some countries may be unable to pay the financial damages awarded by a court to a patient who has sued them, owing to the hospital and/or the doctor not possessing appropriate insurance cover and/or medical indemnity.

Issues can also arise for patients who seek out services that are illegal in their home country. In this case, some countries have the jurisdiction to prosecute their citizen once they have returned home, or in extreme cases extraterritorially arrest and prosecute. In Ireland, especially, in the 1980s-90s there were cases of young rape victims who were banned from traveling to Europe to get legal abortions. Ultimately, Ireland's Supreme Court overturned the ban; they and many other countries have since created "right to travel" amendments.

=== Ethical issues ===
There can be major ethical issues around medical tourism. For example, the illegal purchase of organs and tissues for transplantation had been methodically documented and studied in countries such as China, Pakistan, Colombia and the Philippines. The Declaration of Istanbul distinguishes between ethically problematic "transplant tourism" and "travel for transplantation".

Medical tourism may raise broader ethical issues for the countries in which it is promoted. For example, in India, some argue that a "policy of "medical tourism for the classes and health missions for the masses" will lead to a deepening of the inequities" already embedded in the health care system. In Thailand, in 2008 it was stated that, "Doctors in Thailand have become so busy with foreigners that Thai patients are having trouble getting care". Medical tourism centered on new technologies, such as stem cell treatments, is often criticized on grounds of fraud, blatant lack of scientific rationale and patient safety. However, when pioneering advanced technologies, such as providing "unproven" therapies to patients outside of regular clinical trials, it is often challenging to differentiate between acceptable medical innovation and unacceptable patient exploitation.

=== Medical volunteerism as tourism ===
The field of the medical tourism (referring to volunteers who travel overseas to deliver medical care) has recently attracted negative criticism when compared to the alternative notion of sustainable capacities, i.e., work done in the context of long-term, locally-run, and foreign-supported infrastructures. A preponderance of this criticism appears largely in scientific and peer-reviewed literature. Recently, media outlets with more general readerships have published such criticisms as well.

== Employer-sponsored health care in the US ==
Some US employers have begun exploring medical travel programs as a way to cut employee health care costs. Such proposals have raised stormy debates between employers and trade unions representing workers, with one union stating that it deplored the "shocking new approach" of offering employees overseas treatment in return for a share of the company's savings. The unions also raise the issues of legal liability should something go wrong, and potential job losses in the US health care industry if treatment is outsourced.

Employers may offer incentives such as paying for air travel and waiving out-of-pocket expenses for care outside of the US. For example, in January 2008, Hannaford Bros., a supermarket chain based in Maine, began paying the entire medical bill for employees to travel to Singapore for hip and knee replacements, including travel for the patient and companion. Medical travel packages can integrate with all types of health insurance, including limited benefit plans, preferred provider organizations and high deductible health plans.

In 2000, Blue Shield of California began the United States' first cross-border health plan. Patients in California could travel to one of the three certified hospitals in Mexico for treatment under California Blue Shield. In 2007, a subsidiary of BlueCross BlueShield of South Carolina, Companion Global Healthcare, teamed up with hospitals in Thailand, Singapore, Turkey, Ireland, Costa Rica and India. A 2008 article in Fast Company discusses the globalization of healthcare and describes how various players in the US healthcare market have begun to explore it.

== Impact of COVID-19 on medical tourism ==
The growth of Global Medical Tourism in the last decade has influenced overall growth of health care sector. Due to the multidimensional impact of the Pandemic COVID-19 in the form of a global healthcare crisis, falling global economy, restricted international travel, the medical tourism industry is undergoing a substantial decline.

The CDC has listed various levels of different destinations or countries that are ranked from 1 to 3, with 1 and 2 considered safe to travel. A destination ranked level-3 is considered a warning not to travel to that area.

=== COVID-19 vaccine tourism ===
In the later half of February 2021, it was reported that wealthy and influential people from Canada and European countries flew to the United Arab Emirates to secure early access to the COVID-19 vaccine. The UAE promoted Dubai as a vaccine holiday hub for the wealthy, who could pay large sums of money to get inoculated before they became eligible in their home countries.

In January 2021, Canadian snowbirds traveled to the United States (specifically Florida and Arizona) via air charter for quicker access to the COVID-19 vaccine.

== Destinations ==
=== Africa and the Middle East ===
==== Iran ====
In 2012, 30,000 people came to Iran to receive medical treatment. In 2015, it is estimated that between 150,000 and 200,000 health tourists came to Iran, and this figure is expected to rise to 500,000 a year. Iran medical services are low cost in the fields of cosmetic and plastic surgeries, infertility treatment and dentistry services. According to a report in 2016 by Big Market Research, the global medical tourism market is expected to reach $143 billion by 2022. It was reported in May that the number of tourists traveling to Iran for advanced medical services has grown by 40% over past five years.

==== Israel ====
Israel is a popular destination for medical tourism. Many medical tourists to Israel come from Europe, particularly the former Soviet Union, as well as the United States, Australia, Cyprus, and South Africa. Medical tourists come to Israel for a variety of surgical procedures and therapies, including bone marrow transplants, heart surgery, and catheterization, oncological and neurological treatments, orthopedic procedures, car accident rehabilitation, and in-vitro fertilization. Israel's popularity as a destination for medical tourism stems from its status as a developed country with a high-quality level of medical care, while at the same time having lower medical costs than many other developed countries. Israel is particularly popular as a destination for bone marrow transplants among Cypriots, as the procedure is not available in Cyprus, and for orthopedic procedures among Americans, as the cost of orthopedic procedures in Israel is about half that of in the United States. Israel is a particularly popular destination for people seeking IVF treatments. Medical tourists in Israel use both public and private hospitals, and all major Israeli hospitals offer medical tourism packages which typically cost far less than comparable procedures than in facilities elsewhere with a similarly high standard of care. In 2014, it was estimated that roughly 50,000 medical tourists came to Israel annually. There are reports that these medical tourists obtain preferential treatment, to the detriment of local patients. In addition, some people come to Israel to visit health resorts at the Dead Sea, and on Lake Kinneret.

==== Jordan ====
Jordan, through their Private Hospitals Association, attracted 250,000 international patients accompanied by more than 500,000 companions in 2012, with total revenues exceeding 1B US$. Jordan won the Medical Destination of the year award in 2014 in the IMTJ Medical Travel Awards.

==== South Africa ====
South Africa is the first country in Africa to emerge as a medical tourism destination.

==== Tunisia ====
On the African scale, Tunisia ranks second in the field of health tourism. It is also named the world's second best thalassotherapy destination, behind France.

==== United Arab Emirates ====
United Arab Emirates, especially Dubai, Abu Dhabi, Ras Al Khaimah is a popular destination for medical tourism. The Dubai Health authority has been spearheading medical tourism into UAE, especially Dubai. However, hospitals providing medical tourism are spread all over the seven emirates. UAE has the distinction of having the maximum number of JCI accredited hospitals (under various heads). UAE has inbound medical tourism as well as people going out for medical treatment. The inbound tourism usually is from African countries like Nigeria, Kenya, Uganda, Rwanda, etc. The outbound can be categorized into two segments - the local population (citizens of UAE) and the expats. The locals prefer to go to European destinations like the UK, Germany etc. The expats prefer to go back to their home countries for treatment.

=== Americas ===
==== Brazil ====
In Brazil, Albert Einstein Hospital in São Paulo was the first JCI-accredited facility outside of the US, and more than a dozen Brazilian medical facilities have since been similarly accredited.

==== Canada ====
In comparison to US health costs, patients can save 30 to 60 percent on health costs in Canada.

In the early 1990s, Americans illegally using counterfeit, borrowed, or fraudulently obtained Canadian health insurance cards to obtain free healthcare in Canada became a serious issue due to the high costs it imposed.

==== Costa Rica ====
In Costa Rica, there are two Joint Commission International accredited (JCI) hospitals. Both are in San Jose, Costa Rica. When the World Health Organization (WHO) ranked the world's health systems in the year 2000, Costa Rica was ranked as no. 26, which was higher than the US, and together with Dominica it dominated the list among the Central American countries.

The Deloitte Center for Health Solutions in 2008 reported a cost savings average of between 30 and 70 percent of US prices. In 2019 a knee operation in Clinica Biblica which would have cost around $44,000 in the USA cost $12,200.

==== Dominican Republic ====
The Dominican Republic has been a popular destination for US medical tourists, because it is fairly close. Since 2003, the CDC has reported adverse events after cosmetic surgery, particularly due to liposuction in combination with gluteal fat transfer, abdominoplasty, and breast augmentation. During 2009–2022, 93 U.S. citizens died after cosmetic surgery in the Dominican Republic, and 90% of autopsy-confirmed deaths were due to embolism; in 55% due to fat embolism and in 35% due to pulmonary venous thromboembolism.

==== Mexico ====
Mexico has 98 hospitals accredited by the country's Federal Health Ministry and seven hospitals which are JCI-accredited. Mexico is most reputed for advanced care in dentistry and cosmetic surgery.

In recent years, Los Algodones, Baja California, a settlement of fewer than 6,000 people located on the US border near Yuma, Arizona, has become a major destination for Americans and Canadians seeking dental services. Roughly 600 dentists practice in the community, catering mainly to tourists, leading the community to be nicknamed "Molar City".

==== United States ====
A 2015 report from the United States International Trade Commission found that between 150,000 and 320,000 medical tourists from the United States were traveling worldwide for the purpose of receiving in-patient medical care. While some have estimated that 750,000 American medical tourists traveled from the United States to other countries in 2007 (up from 500,000 in 2006), according to the McKinsey report, 45% of North American medical tourists travel to Asia, 26% go to Latin America, 2% go to the Middle East, and 27% travel to another country in North America.

The availability of advanced medical technology and sophisticated training of physicians are cited as driving motivators for growth in foreigners traveling to the US for medical care, whereas the low costs for hospital stays and major/complex procedures at Western-accredited medical facilities abroad are cited as major motivators for American travelers. Also, the decline in value of the US dollar between 2007 and 2013 used to offer additional incentives for foreign travel to the US, although cost differences between the US and many locations in Asia are larger than any currency fluctuations.

Several major medical centers and teaching hospitals offer international patient centers that cater to patients from foreign countries who seek medical treatment in the US. Many of these organizations offer service coordinators to assist international patients with arrangements for medical care, accommodations, finances and transportation including air ambulance services.

=== Asia and the Pacific Islands ===
==== China ====
Ctrip's 2016 Online Medical Tourism Report indicates that the number of travelers who enroll in the oversea medical tourism through its platform increased fivefold over the previous year, and more than 500,000 Chinese visitors are expected to go on medical tourism. The top ten medical tourism destinations are Japan, Korea, the US, Taiwan, Germany, Singapore, Malaysia, Sweden, Thailand, and India. Regular health checks made up the majority share of Chinese medical tourism in 2016, representing over 50% of all medical tourism trips for tourists originating in China.

==== Hong Kong ====
All twelve of Hong Kong's private hospitals have been surveyed and accredited by the UK's Trent Accreditation Scheme since early 2001.

==== India ====
Medical tourism is a growing sector in India. Gurgaon is India's largest medical tourism hub, followed by Chennai, which is regarded as "India's Health City" as it attracts 45% of health tourists visiting India and 40% of domestic health tourists.

India's medical tourism sector was expected to experience an annual growth rate of 30% from 2012, making it a $2 billion industry by 2015.

In August 2019, the Indian government enacted measures making it easier for foreigners to receive medical treatment without necessarily applying for a medical visa. A major reason for foreign medical tourists to choose India is because it has 40 hospitals accredited by the US Joint Commission.

India is increasingly becoming popular with Africans seeking medical treatment overseas. Treatments are approved by the World Health Organization (WHO) and the US Food and Drug Administration.

==== Malaysia ====
The majority of the foreign patients seeking medical treatments in Malaysia are from Indonesia, with smaller numbers of foreign patients coming from India, Singapore, Japan, Australia, Europe, the US and the Middle East. In 2008, Indonesians comprised 75% of all foreign patients receiving care in Malaysia; Europeans, 3%; Japanese, 3%; Singaporeans, 1% and citizens from Middle Eastern countries, 1%. By 2011, Indonesians comprised 57% of all foreign patients in Malaysia as the number of patients of other nationalities grew.

Health insurance companies in Singapore have recently permitted their policyholders to be treated in Malaysia where services are cheaper than in Singapore.

==== New Zealand ====
In 2008, it was estimated that on average New Zealand's surgical costs are around 15 to 20% the cost of the same surgical procedure in the USA.

==== Pakistan ====
Pakistan has four Joint Commission International (JCI) accredited hospitals in Pakistan. Mostly people travel for treatments in Pakistan from Afghanistan, United Kingdom, Middle East and United States.

==== Singapore ====
Singapore has a dozen hospitals and health centers with JCI accreditation. In 2013 medical expenditure generated from medical tourists, mostly from more complex medical procedures, such as heart surgery, was S$832 million, a decline of 25 percent from 2012's S$1.11 billion, as the hospitals faced more competition from neighboring countries for less complex work.

==== Thailand ====
Foreigners seeking treatment for everything from open-heart surgery to fertility treatments have made Thailand and its accredited hospitals a popular destination for medical tourism, attracting an estimated 2.81 million patients in 2015, up 10.2 percent. In 2013, medical tourists spent as much as US$4.7 billion, according to government statistics. As of 2019, with 64 accredited hospitals, Thailand is currently among the top 10 medical tourism destinations in the world. In 2017, Thailand registered 3.3 million visits by foreigners seeking specialized medical treatment. In 2018, this number grew to 3.5 million.

==== Vietnam ====
Vietnam receives approximately 300,000 medical tourists annually, generating an estimated US$2 billion in revenue, according to Hospital Management Asia. The majority of medical visitors travel to Vietnam for dental services, plastic and aesthetic surgery, orthopedic procedures, and weight loss surgery, as reported by Voice of America.

According to recent analyses by Voice of America and Le Journal de Nhân Dân, and an interview with Vietnamese healthcare strategist Tran Quoc Bao —recognized among the Top 10 Best and Most Influential Hospital CEOs in Asia 2024—the growth of Vietnam’s medical tourism sector is largely driven by its qualified medical professionals, modern hospital infrastructure, and cost-effective treatment options.

=== Europe ===
Even within Europe, although therapy protocols might be approved by the European Medicines Agency (EMA), several countries have their own review organizations in order to evaluate whether the same therapy protocol would be "cost-effective", so that patients face differences in the therapy protocols, particularly in the access of these drugs, which might be partially explained by the financial strength of the particular Health System.

In 2006, it was ruled that under the conditions of the E112 European health scheme, UK health authorities had to pay the bill if one of their patients could establish urgent medical reasons for seeking quicker treatment in another European union country.

The European directive on the application of patients' rights to cross-border healthcare was agreed in 2011.

An online survey of EU migrants, mostly from Poland, Hungary and Romania, in the UK by the Centre for Population Change in 2019 showed that 46% of them preferred the health system in their country of origin. Only 36% preferred NHS medical treatment, and fewer among those from Western Europe.

==== Albania ====
Albania become a health target for Italian and few other European countries mostly in aesthetic surgery. Albania has invested in attracting not only international patients but also staff with mostly Italian doctors. As recognized by AP news KEIT Day Hospital was built in 2011 with international patient in mind. Albania is also known for dental tourism, where over 200 dental clinics are providing services to international patients.

==== Azerbaijan ====
Azerbaijan is a target of health tourists from Iran, Turkey, Georgia and Russia. The Bona Dea International Hospital in Baku was built in 2018 to attract international patients, and has staff from various European countries.

==== Croatia ====
Croatia has some claims to be the oldest health tourism destination in Europe, as the Hygienic Association of Hvar was founded in 1868.

==== Finland ====
On December 9, 2013, the City of Helsinki decided that all minors under the age of 18 and all pregnant mothers living in Helsinki without a valid visa or residence permit are granted the right to the same health care and at the same price as all citizens of the city.

Volunteer doctors of Global Clinic have tried to help these people, for whom only acute care has been available. This means that the Finnish health care system is open for all people coming outside of the European Union.

==== France ====
British NHS patients have been offered treatment in France to reduce waiting lists for hip, knee and cataract surgery since 2002. France is a popular tourist destination but also ranked the world's leading health care system by the World Health Organization. European Court of Justice said that National Health Service (England) has to pay back British patients.

The number of patients is growing, and in 2016, France scored # 7 in the Medical Tourism Index.

==== Germany ====
In 2017 there were said to be around 250,000 foreign patients who brought more than 1.2 billion euros income to German hospitals. Some were visitors who fell ill unexpectedly, but it is estimated that more than 40 percent came for planned treatment, the majority from Poland, the Netherlands or France. There have long been medical tourists from the Middle East. University hospitals and the large municipal clinics, such as University Hospital Freiburg or Vivantes in Berlin, are the most popular destinations. Some require payment in full before they start treatment.

The Hallwang Clinic GmbH is said to be the most high-profile clinic in the European private cancer industry, centred in Germany, which attracts patients from the US, the UK, Australia and the Middle East, offering a variety of different treatments, some of which do not appear to be evidence based; the clinic has been accused of selling false hope.

==== Greece ====
Greece is becoming a major global destination for medical tourism. A long-established tourist destination, Greece has experienced a growing number of international patients due to enhanced healthcare services and the training of medical staff.

==== Hungary ====
During the Goulash Communism era, Germans and Austrian tourists in Hungary also began visiting dentists. As of 2015 Mosonmagyaróvár had about 350 dental clinics, more per capita than anywhere else on Earth. Prices for dental procedures are one third to one half of the price in Vienna, Austria, 60 km (37 mi) away, and one quarter that of Switzerland or Denmark. An Austrian can be treated during a day trip, or also have a vacation in the area for the price of one or two nights in a Vienna hotel.

==== Lithuania ====
Health Tourism Lithuania, a booking agent, was established in 2018, focusing on the Scandinavian market, but in 2019 in response to longer waiting lists in the NHS noticed an increase in enquiries about hip replacements, in addition to the existing interest in cosmetic surgery and dentistry from Britons. A hip replacement costs £3,340, about a third of the price of a commercial procedure in the UK.

==== Russia ====
In his address to the Federal Assembly of the Russian Federation dated March 1, 2018, Russian President Vladimir Putin stressed the need to develop health care and export services in the field of medicine and tourism.

In accordance with the decree of the President of the Russian Federation of May 7, 2018 No. 204 "on national goals and strategic objectives of the development of the Russian Federation for the period up to 2024" the volume of exports of medical services by 2024 will have to be $1 billion per year. RAMT in order to implement the Decree of the President of the Russian Federation of 7 May 2018 No. 204, the Federal non-profit organization Russian Association of Medical Tourism was established.

==== Serbia ====
Serbia has a variety of clinics catering to medical tourists in areas of cosmetic surgery, dental care, fertility treatment and weight loss procedures. The country is also a major international hub for gender reassignment surgery.

==== Turkey ====
The cost of medical recourses in Turkey is quite affordable compared to Western European countries. Therefore, thousands of people each year travel to Turkey for their medical treatments. Turkey is especially becoming a hub for hair transplant surgery. Dental treatment, including procedures such as veneers, crowns and implants, is also offered to international patients in cities such as Istanbul, Ankara and Antalya. Almost 178,000 tourists visited for health purposes in the first six months of 2018. 67% used private hospitals, 24% public hospitals and 9% university hospitals. The Regulation on International Health Tourism and Tourist Health came into force on 13 July 2017. It only applies to those coming specifically for treatment. USHAŞ was established in 2019 by Turkish Ministry of Health to promote and regulate medical tourism in Turkey.

==== United Kingdom ====
Both the publicly owned National Health Service and private hospitals attracts medical tourism. Many private hospitals and clinics in the United Kingdom are medical tourism destinations. UK private hospitals have mandatory registration with the UK's watchdog, the Care Quality Commission. The vast majority of medical tourism in the UK is attracted to London where there are 25 private hospitals and clinics and 12 private patient units run by NHS hospital trusts. In 2017 there was a 3% decline in the £1.55 billion market because of fewer clients from the Middle East. Overseas patients coming to London are particularly likely to be seeking complex cancer, neurosciences, cardiovascular and pediatric services supported by strong clinical expertise reflected by the leading teaching hospitals based in the UK. Income for NHS providers rose by 9% in 2018–9, pushing the Royal Marsden nearer the 50% statutory limit.

UK dental patients largely go to Hungary and Poland. Fertility tourists mostly travel to Eastern Europe, Cyprus and Spain.

===== Abuse in the UK =====
It is alleged that health tourists in the UK often target the NHS for its free-at-the-point-of-care treatment, allegedly costing the NHS up to £200 million each year, as of 2015. A study in 2013 concluded that the UK was a net exporter of medical tourists, with 63,000 UK residents traveling abroad for treatment and about 52,000 patients getting treatment in UK. Medical tourists treated as private patients by NHS trusts are more profitable than UK private patients, yielding close to a quarter of the revenue from only seven percent of volume of cases.

In the summer of 2015 immigration officers from the Border Force were stationed in St George's University Hospitals NHS Foundation Trust to train staff to identify "potentially chargeable patients". In October 2016 the trust announced that it planned to require photo identity papers or proof of their right to remain in the UK such as asylum status or a visa for pregnant women. Those not able to provide satisfactory documents would be sent to the trust's overseas patient team "for specialist document screening, in liaison with the UK Border Agency and the Home Office." It was estimated that £4.6 million a year was spent on care for ineligible patients. A pilot scheme to check whether patients were entitled to free NHS care in 18 NHS trusts, 11 in London, for two months in 2017 asked 8,894 people for two forms of ID prior to non-emergency care. Only 50 were not eligible for free NHS treatment. Campaigners claimed this was "part of the Government's hostile environment policy", and that in Newham hospital "you will see huge signs saying you may not be eligible for free NHS treatment".

The bills issued to patients thought to be ineligible far exceed the sums actually collected. Most trusts do not have dedicated staff for bill collection. Ineligible patients generally live overseas, many have no money, and some demonstrate that they were eligible for free treatment after invoices had been issued.

== See also ==
- Beautyscapes: Mapping Cosmetic Surgery Tourism
- Consumer import of prescription drugs
- Immigration health surcharge
- Birth tourism
- Wellness tourism
- Yoga tourism
- Suicide tourism
