= BIOTECanada =

Canadian biotechnology industry association

- Formation: 1987; 39 years ago
- Headquarters: Ottawa, Ontario
- Website: https://www.biotech.ca/
- Formerly called: Industrial Biotechnology Association of Canada

BIOTECanada, previously the Industrial Biotechnology Association of Canada, is a Canadian biotechnology industry association based in Ottawa, Ontario. It is an industry-funded membership organization composed of over 250 national and international pharmaceutical and gene therapy companies, medical device manufacturers, agricultural science businesses, law firms, academic institutions, research and development networks, advertising agencies, insurance companies and financial services firms.

BIOTECanada administers the Gold Leaf Awards, presented annually to individuals and organizations who are deemed to have made significant contributions to Canada's biotechnology sector.

== History ==
The organization was incorporated in 1987 as the Industrial Biotechnology Association of Canada.

Health Canada partnered with BIOTECanada in May 2012 to organize a summit on clinical and regulatory topics associated with biosimilars. The event was held in association with the International Alliance for Biological Standardization, and was observed by representatives from the Patented Medicine Prices Review Board and the Canadian Agency for Drugs and Technologies in Health. Panelists included representatives from academia, regulatory bodies and industry, such as UMass Memorial Health, Janssen Pharmaceuticals, the Robarts Research Institute, Alberta Blue Cross, Mount Sinai Hospital and Sunnybrook Health Sciences Centre.

In 2017, BIOTECanada published a report detailing proposed initiatives to use biotechnology to address issues including population growth, climate change, food security, health, and economic instability. President and CEO Andrew Casey sent a letter in July 2017 to Innovation, Science and Economic Development Canada proposing measures to offset costs of patent filings, and to reduce taxation on intellectual property revenues.

=== COVID-19 ===
Several representatives of BIOTECanada participated as members and advisors in the COVID-19 Therapeutics Task Force convened by Innovation, Science and Economic Development Canada.

In June 2022, BIOTECanada hosted the Canada Pavilion at the BIO International Convention, an annual biotechnology conference led by the Biotechnology Innovation Organization (BIO).

== Organization ==
=== Partners ===
BIOTECanada is partnered with Avantor, Borden Ladner Gervais, Silicon Valley Bank, and Wilson Sonsini Goodrich & Rosati. The organization is a supporting member of BioTalent Canada, a professional network for the biotechnology community. It is also a member of the Biotechnology Innovation Organization (BIO), and a founding institution of Clinical Trials Ontario. It is a participating organization of the Virtual Biosecurity Center, an initiative of the Federation of American Scientists.

=== Members ===
BIOTECanada's current membership includes:

- AbbVie
- Acuitas Therapeutics
- adMare BioInnovations
- Advanced Accelerator Applications
- Agri-Food Innovation Council
- Alexion Pharmaceuticals
- Alnylam Pharmaceuticals
- Amgen
- Antibe Therapeutics
- AquaBounty Technologies
- AstraZeneca
- Bayer
- BeiGene
- BioAlberta
- Biogen
- Bioindustrial Innovation Canada
- BioMarin Pharmaceutical
- Bioscience Association Manitoba
- Biotechnology Innovation Organization
- Blake, Cassels & Graydon
- Borden Ladner Gervais
- Bristol Myers Squibb
- Canada's Venture Capital and Private Equity Association
- Canadian Advanced Therapies Training Institute
- Canadian Glycomics Network (GlycoNet)
- Canadian Seed Trade Association
- CBRE Group
- Centre for Commercialization of Regenerative Medicine
- Centre for Probe Development & Commercialization
- CSL Behring
- Deloitte
- Eisai
- Eli Lilly and Company
- Fasken Martineau Dumoulin LLP
- Ferring Pharmaceuticals
- Fonds de solidarité FTQ
- Genentech
- Genome Canada
- Gilead Sciences
- Global Public Affairs
- Gowling WLG
- Grifols
- Hoffman-La Roche
- Horizon Pharma
- Incyte
- Innovative Targeting Solutions
- Ipsen Biopharmaceuticals
- IQVIA
- J.P. Morgan & Co.
- Janssen Biotech
- Jazz Pharmaceuticals
- Korea Biotechnology Industry Organization
- Life Sciences British Columbia
- Lumira Capital
- Mallinckrodt
- MaRS Discovery District
- Medicago Inc.
- Medtech Canada
- Merck
- Mitsubishi Tanabe Pharma
- New Zealand Biotech
- Newfoundland & Labrador Association of Tech Industries
- Novartis
- Novo Nordisk
- Ontario Bioscience Innovation Organization
- Pfizer Canada
- Precision NanoSystems
- Prince Edward Island BioAlliance
- Research Canada
- Royal Bank of Canada
- Sanofi
- Seagen
- Seqirus
- Servier
- Silicon Valley Bank
- Smart & Biggar
- Sobi
- Taiho Pharmaceutical
- Takeda Pharmaceutical Company
- Teva Canada
- Toronto Innovation Acceleration Partners
- UCB
- Ultragenyx
- University Health Network
- Valneva
- VBI Vaccines
- Vertex Pharmaceuticals
- VIDO-InterVac
- VWR International
- Wilson Sonsini Goodrich & Rosati
- Zymeworks

Former members include the Agricultural Institute of Canada, Centre for the Commercialization of Antibodies and Biologics, Ernst & Young, Genzyme, Innovation PEI, International Centre for Infectious Disease, Johnson & Johnson, KPMG, Life Sciences Association of Manitoba, McKesson Corporation, National Research Council Canada, Pan-Provincial Vaccine Enterprise, PricewaterhouseCoopers, Sanofi Pasteur, Shoppers Drug Mart Specialty Health Network, University of Guelph, University of Manitoba and University of Waterloo.
