= Kwantlen Park Secondary School =

École Kwantlen Park Secondary School
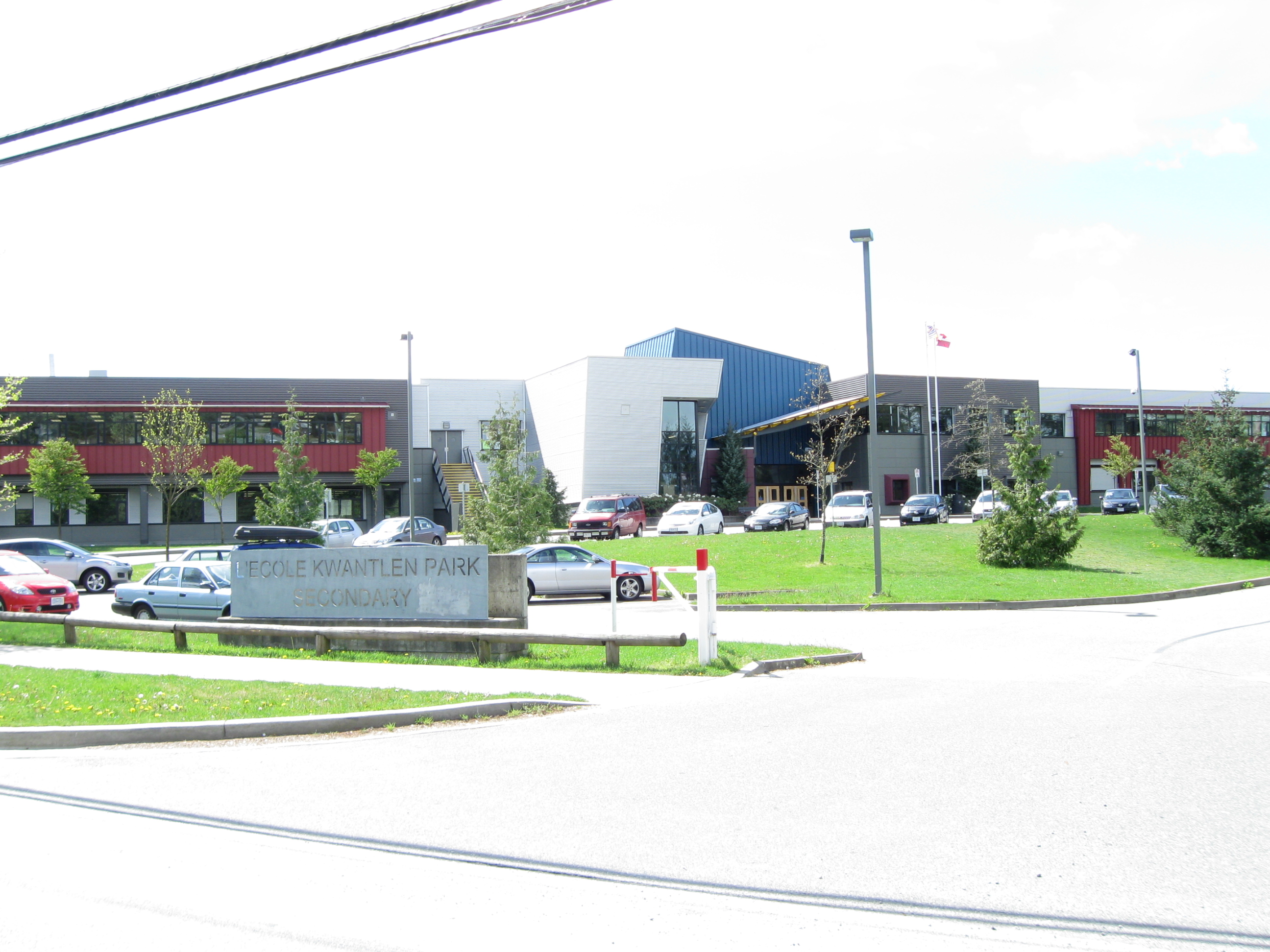

Location
- 10441 132 Street; Surrey, British Columbia, V3T 3V3; Canada; 49.19248°N 122.85774°W

Information
- Founded: 2002
- School board: School District 36 Surrey
- Superintendent: Mark Pearmain
- Principal: Mike Kilpatrick
- Grades: 8–12
- Enrolment: ▲1,697 (2025)
- Area: Surrey, British Columbia
- Colours: Maroon, Black, White
- Mascot: Timmy The Timberwolf
- Team name: Kwantlen Park Timberwolves
- Feeder schools: K. B. Woodward Elementary School, Old Yale Road Elementary School, James Ardiel Elementary School, Mountainview Montessori, Surrey Traditional, Bridgeview Elementary
- Website: Official website

École Kwantlen Park Secondary School is a public high school in Surrey, British Columbia, Canada, and part of School District 36 Surrey. Kwantlen Park Secondary is named after the park beside which it is located. Approval was required from the Kwantlen First Nation in order to use their name. It ranked 25 out of 298 schools in the British Columbia and the Yukon according to the Fraser Institute Studies in Education Policy in 2006–2007.

== History ==
In the 1990s, Board policy resulted in the restructuring of Surrey schools so that all secondary schools enrolled grades 8 through 12. Consequently, West Whalley Junior High was demolished in August 2002 and the replacement school opened in September 2002 on an adjacent site, as "École Kwantlen Park Secondary". Len Shepherd Secondary and West Whalley Junior High were amalgamated, which resulted in the entire student populations and most staff being transferred to the newly built school. Previously available programs, French Immersion at West Whalley, and Inter-A at Len Shepherd, were also brought over to the new school.

== Academics ==
Along with standard Ministry of Education offerings including law, social justice, band and fine arts, there are two Surrey School District "Choice Programs" hosted on this site. French Immersion (grades 8–12) and a one-of-a-kind program called Inter-A are provided here. Inter-A students in grades 7–12 work in cross-grade clusters at their own pace in mathematics, which shares a year-long approach to physical education and fine arts courses.

== Facilities ==
There are Metal Work, Carpentry, and Info-tech programs. A drama program is taught in a 200+ seat theatre. Grounds are shared with the adjacent park in a partnership with the City of Surrey and contain baseball diamonds, soccer and all-weather fields. There is a renovated playground and an outdoor swimming pool in the park behind the school.
