= Hygienic Association of Hvar =

Croatian health organization

The Hygienic Association of Hvar (Croatian: Societa Igienica) is a Croatian health organization founded in 1868 (158 years ago) on the island of Hvar by Juraj II. Duboković, Bishop of Hvar.

It was an early instance of health tourism, as it was established for the benefit of foreign visitors, who were to be encouraged to regain their health with the help of the Hvar town climate. The association raised funds to invest in facilities for the visitors. The bishop was the biggest stock holder and first president of the association. It specialised in chest illnesses.

It claims to be the first organised tourism in Europe. It opened a hotel, adapted from a private house, October 15 1868. It had 13 single rooms with heating and a restaurant, with a staff of a cook, two waiters and a chambermaid from Trieste. It moved to a military building on the Fabrika in 1872, then after securing a donation of 200 florins from the Empress Elisabeth of Austria, who became its patron, built a new hotel, the Kur Hotel Kaiserin Elizabeth. When it was completed in 1903 it had 35 beds, bathrooms, a reading room, restaurant and a coffee-house. The society collapsed around 1918.
