= Science World (Vancouver) =

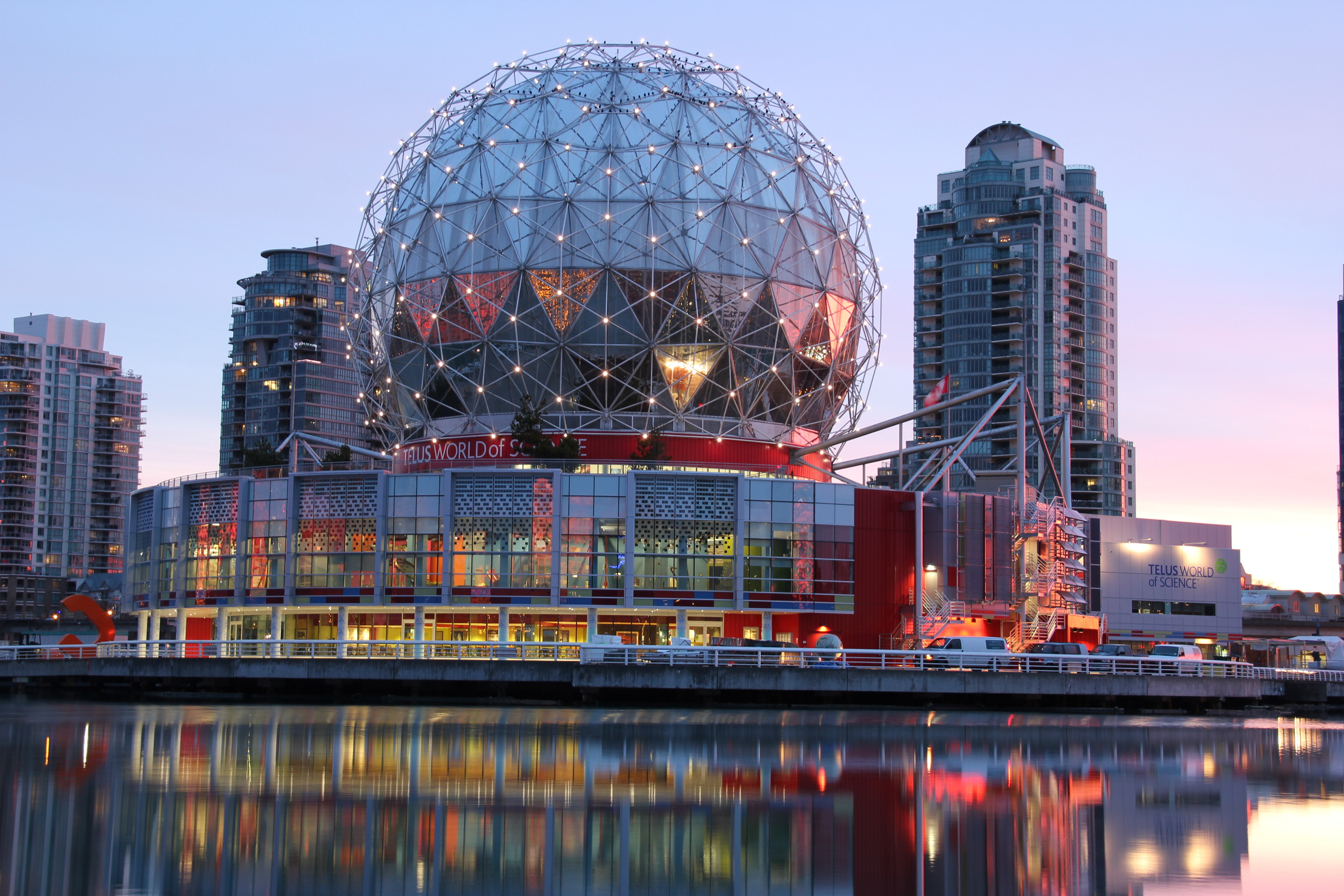

- Location of Science World in Vancouver
- Former name: Telusphere (2005); Telus World of Science Vancouver (2005–2020)
- Established: 1989
- Location: 1455 Quebec Street, Vancouver, British Columbia, Canada
- Coordinates: 49.273251°N 123.103767°W
- Type: Science museum
- Visitors: 1,009,583 (2019)
- CEO: Tracy Redies
- Chairperson: Cheryl Slusarchuk
- Architect: Bruno Freschi
- Public transit access: Main Street–Science World
- Website: www.scienceworld.ca

Science World is a science centre run by a not-for-profit organization called ASTC Science World Society in Vancouver, British Columbia, Canada. It is located at the eastern end of False Creek and features many permanent interactive exhibits and displays, as well as areas with varying topics throughout the years.

Prior to the building being handed over to Science World by the city government in 1987, the building was built as Expo Centre for the Expo 86 world's fair. Following the end of Expo 86, the building was re-purposed as a science centre. The science centre opened on May 6, 1989, as Science World. The museum was branded as Science World at Telus World of Science under a naming rights agreement with sponsor Telus Corporation from 2005 to 2020 before it reverted to its original name.

== History ==
In 1977, Barbara Brink ran mobile hands-on exhibits known as the Extended I around British Columbia's Lower Mainland. Later, the temporary Arts, Sciences & Technology Centre opened in downtown Vancouver on January 15, 1982, attracting over 600,000 visitors. Another 400,000 benefited from the centre's outreach programs, which were delivered around the province.

When Vancouver was chosen to host the transportation-themed 1986 World's Fair (Expo 86), a Buckminster Fuller–inspired geodesic dome was designed by Expo's chief architect Bruno Freschi to serve as the fair's Expo Centre. Construction began in 1984 and was completed by early 1985. After Expo closed its gates in October of the following year, an intensive lobbying campaign was launched to secure the landmark building, relocate the "Arts, Sciences and Technology Centre" into the post-Expo dome, and convert the Expo Centre into Science World. With much government backing, the dome was obtained from the province and a massive fund-raising campaign ensued. Donations from the federal, provincial and municipal governments, the GVRD, the private sector, foundations, and individuals contributed $19.1 million to build an addition to the Expo Centre, redesign the interior and fabricate exhibits. In 1988, in a four-month preview, over 310,000 visitors came to see the new building. A year later, the 400-seat Omnimax theatre in the upper section of the dome was opened, extending upon the 3D IMAX theatre which was built in 1986 for the Expo "Transitions" film series.

The centre entered its first title sponsorship agreement with Alcan Inc. in 1996, renaming its Omnimax Theatre the Alcan Omnimax Theatre. Alcan later decided to sponsor the organization in different ways and the theatre returned to its original name, the Omnimax Theatre.

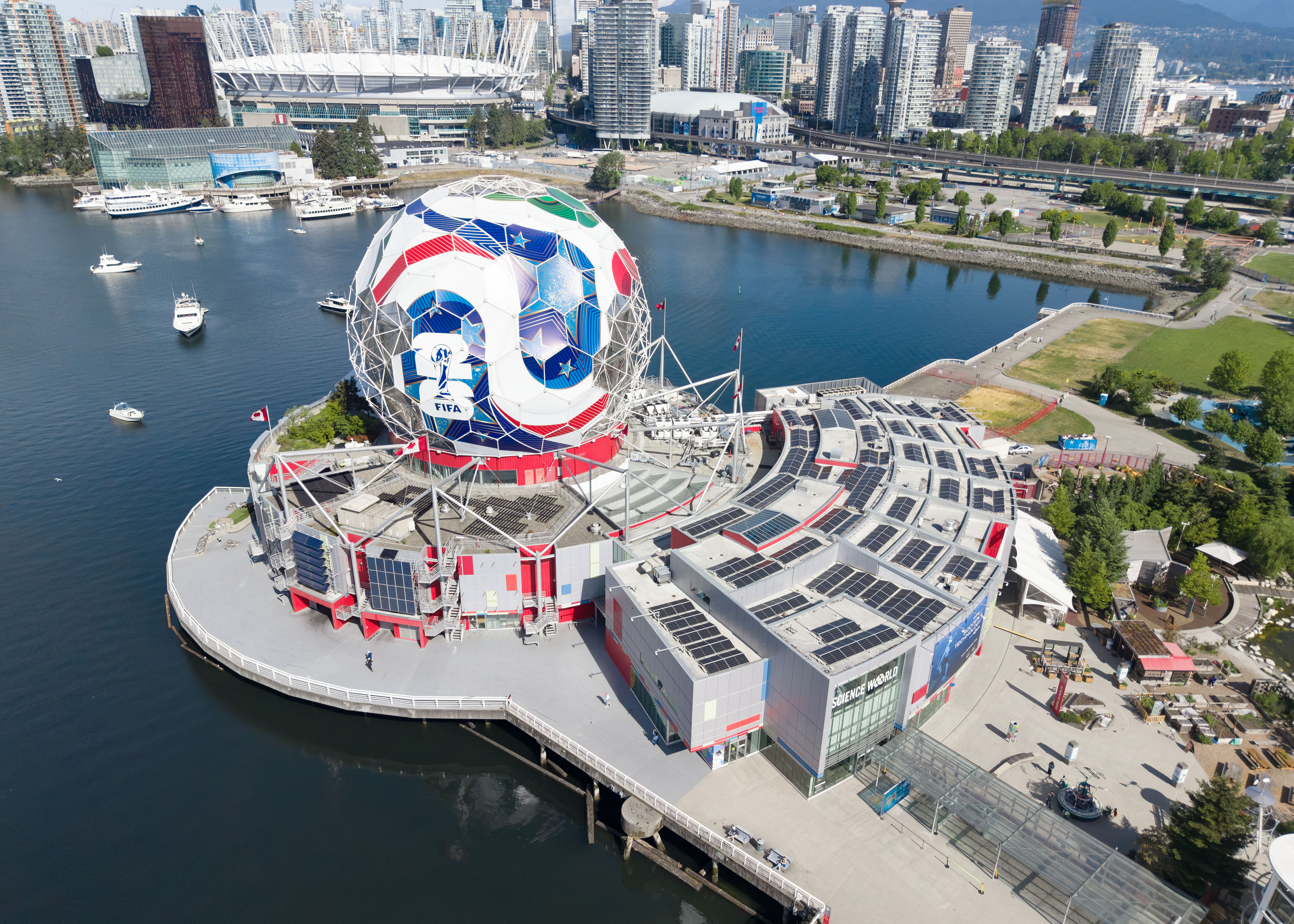
Science World used as a temporary display for the 2026 FIFA World Cup

In January 2005, the building was officially renamed "Telusphere" as part of an agreement where Telus gave a $9-million donation in return for the naming rights to the building. This new name proved universally unpopular. In mid-2005, the name of the science centre was changed to "Science World at the Telus World of Science". The brand "Telus World of Science" was used for several other science centres in Calgary and Edmonton. (Note: Telus World of Science centres were institutions sponsored by Telus. All science centres branded under "Telus World of Science" operated independently of one another.) The naming rights agreement ended in 2020, with the science centre dropping "Telus World of Science" from its name. During this period, the name change did not affect the nearby Main Street–Science World SkyTrain station.

During the 2010 Winter Olympics, Science World played host to "Sochi World", a hospitality area representing the country of Russia, hosts of the 2014 Winter Olympics. The attraction closed in mid-January 2010 to facilitate the transformation, and was re-opened that March. Science World underwent renovation after the 2010 Winter Olympics. The indoor renovations were completed by mid-2012 and the adjacent Ken Spencer Science Park opened in late 2012.

On July 29, 2020, the organization's board of governors announced that BC Liberal MLA from Surrey-White Rock, Tracy Redies, would be resigning her legislature seat and taking over as the CEO of Science World, from September 14, 2020. The new CEO would be replacing the interim CEO, Janet Wood. Dr. Bonnie Henry was named as a "Friend of Science World" in 2021.

In January 2022, Science World entered a long-term partnership with Acuitas Therapeutics, developers of the lipid nanoparticle technology used in the Pfizer–BioNTech COVID-19 vaccine. In September 2022, Teck Resources announced a $650,000 donation to Science World to increase awareness of the antimicrobial properties of copper. The contribution funded the addition of copper layers to the surface of various exhibits, door handles and countertops.

In May 2026, the exterior of the building was transformed into a soccer ball (specifically the Trionda) to honour the 2026 FIFA World Cup that would be partly hosted in Vancouver that summer.

== Activities ==
=== Outreach ===
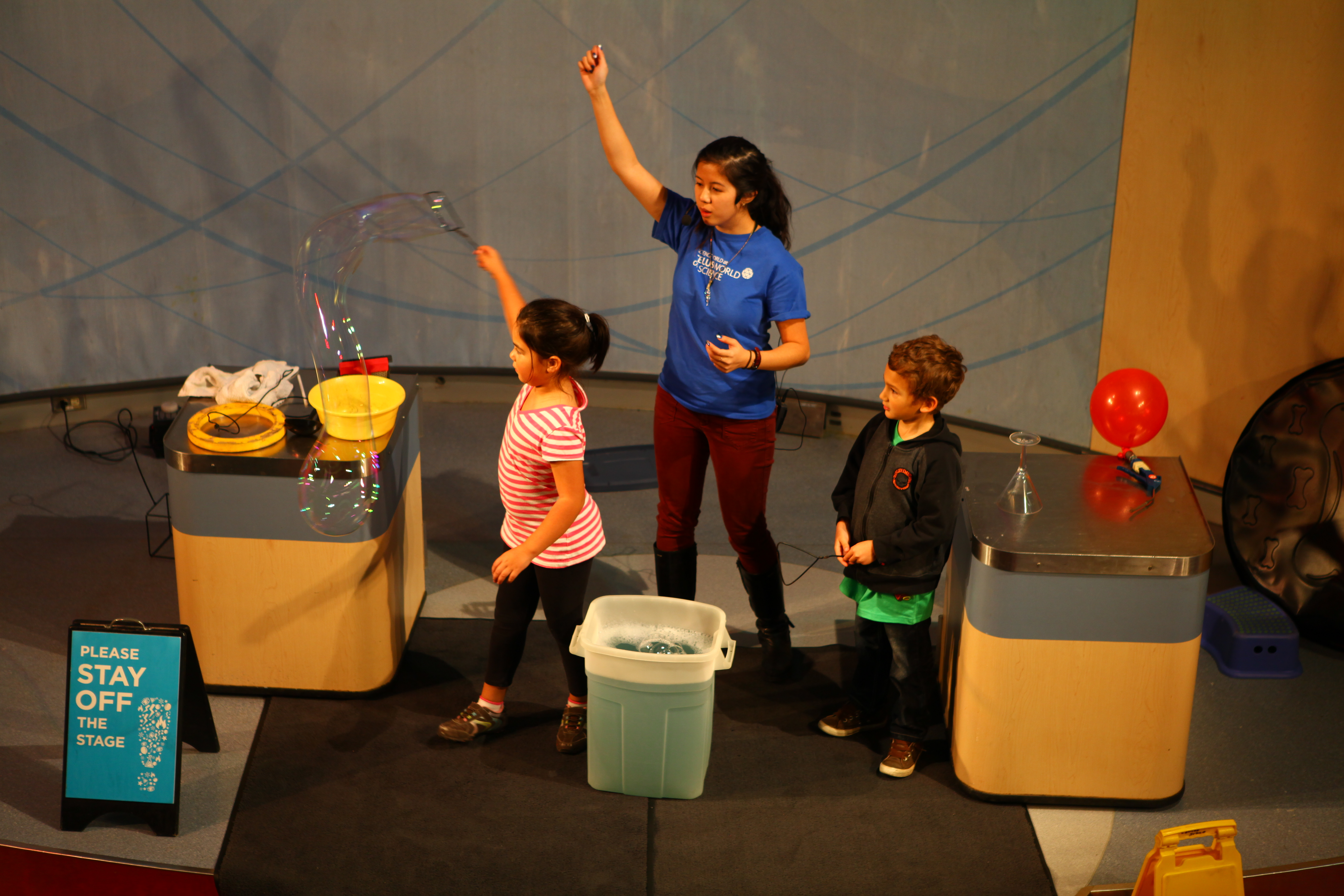
A member of the museum guides children through a demonstration.

Science World runs a variety of outreach programs all over British Columbia. Some examples include Scientists and Innovators in the Schools, a volunteer-based mentor program to inspire students' interest in STEM through interactive presentations in classrooms; On the Road, where staff travel extensively throughout the province to conduct workshops and present science-themed shows in schools and communities that otherwise would not have access to a local science centre; and Super Science Club, where Science World educators conduct after-school programs in underserved schools to inspire at-risk children to become passionate about lifelong science and technology learning.

=== COVID-19 ===
In July 2021, Science World received a $50,000 grant from the Government of Canada in order to develop a programming series surrounding vaccines. It was awarded through a grant program called "Encouraging Vaccine Confidence in Canada" jointly administered by the Canadian Institutes of Health Research (CIHR), Natural Sciences and Engineering Research Council (NSERC) and the Social Sciences and Humanities Research Council (SSHRC), intended to increase uptake and acceptance of COVID-19 vaccines across Canada.

== Organization ==
=== Funding ===
Science World operates with funding from donors to the ASTC Science World Society and programming partners. Supporters for the 2021/2022 fiscal year include:

- Acuitas Therapeutics
- Amazon
- Amgen
- BC Children's Hospital
- BC Hydro
- Best Buy Canada
- Big Brothers Big Sisters of Canada
- Boeing
- British Columbia Institute of Technology
- Cinesite
- City of Vancouver
- COWI
- Electronic Arts
- Engineers and Geoscientists British Columbia
- Enterprise Holdings
- First West Credit Union
- Fluor
- Genome British Columbia
- Harbour Air Seaplanes
- Hootsuite
- HSBC Bank Canada
- IA Financial Group
- Innovate BC
- Mainframe Studios
- Mastercard
- Methanex
- Microsoft
- Natural Sciences and Engineering Research Council
- Orbis Investment Management
- Province of British Columbia
- Royal Bank of Canada/RBC Foundation
- SAP
- Scotiabank
- SkyBox Labs
- Stemcell Technologies
- S.U.C.C.E.S.S.
- Teck Resources
- Telus
- TransLink
- Union Gospel Mission
- University of British Columbia School of Biomedical Engineering
- Vancouver Fraser Port Authority
- Vancouver Public Library, Carnegie Branch
- Wawanesa Insurance
- Wells Fargo Bank
- Wheaton Precious Metals
- White Spot
- WildBrain Studios
- WorkSafeBC
- Zymeworks

Previous financial and programming partners have included:

- 1QBit
- Apple
- Applied Science Technologists and Technicians of British Columbia
- BC Tech Association
- BCCDC Foundation for Public Health
- Bell Canada
- Boston Pizza
- British Columbia Centre for Disease Control
- BroadbandTV Corp
- Call2Recycle
- Coast Capital Savings
- Concert Properties
- D-Wave Systems
- Daily Hive
- Douglas College
- Dyson
- ECO Canada
- Employment and Social Development Canada
- Fairmont Pacific Rim
- Finning International
- General Fusion
- Georgia Straight
- Government of Canada (through its CanCode program)
- Honda Canada Foundation
- IBM
- Impark
- Imperial Oil Foundation
- Intel
- Kwantlen Polytechnic University
- Langara College
- Let's Talk Science
- Marriott
- McKesson Corporation
- Natural Resources Canada
- Nimbus School of Recording and Media
- Parks Canada
- Praxair
- PricewaterhouseCoopers
- Royal Astronomical Society of Canada
- Save-On-Foods
- Simon Fraser University
- Teekay
- TRIUMF
- Trulioo
- Unbounce
- United Way of the Lower Mainland
- United Way Worldwide
- University of British Columbia Faculty of Forestry
- University of Northern British Columbia
- VanCity Savings Credit Union
- Vancouver Community College
- Vancouver Foundation
- Vancouver International Airport
- Vancouver Magazine
- Vancouver School Board
- Western Economic Diversification Canada
- WeWork
- Workday, Inc.
- Z95.3

== See also ==
- List of museums in British Columbia
