= Hallwang Clinic =

Private oncology clinic in Germany

Hallwang Clinic GmbH
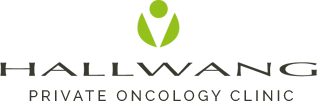

Geography
- Location: Silberwaldstr. 34, Dornstetten, Baden-Württemberg, Germany
- Coordinates: 48.49007°N 8.50141°E

Organisation
- Care system: Private

Services
- Standards: medical oncology, hematology

History
- Founded: 2014

Links
- Website: www.hallwang-clinic.com

The Hallwang Clinic is a private oncology clinic based in Dornstetten, Germany, founded in 2014. It is known for selling unproven and ineffective therapies alongside more conventional cancer treatments.

== Therapies ==
In addition to conventional therapies, the clinic offers a large variety of unproven and pseudoscientific treatments including homeopathy, orthomolecular medicine and ozone therapy.

Most of these are not available on the United Kingdom's National Health Service (NHS). The clinic is accused of exaggerating the likely effectiveness of the treatments it sells.

== History ==
The Waldeck Klinik KG focused on rehabilitation and closed in 2009. In 2009, Dr. Ursula Jacob opened Privatklinik Dr. Ursula Jacob GmbH, focussing on holistic cancer treatments, including alternative cancer therapies such as ozone therapy and hyperthermia therapy. Ursula left the center in 2013 and relocated to Munich where she runs a prevention clinic. Privatklinik Dr. Ursula Jacob GmbH changed its name in 2014 to the Hallwang Clinic.

Starting in 2014, the current Hallwang Clinic opened at the same location, as a specialized private oncology clinic, led by board-certified medical oncologists. The clinic claims that the medical team consists of medical oncologists, hematologists and internal medicine specialists. As of 2019, the largest shareholder was Albert Schmierer, who owns a chain of pharmacies specialising in homeopathy.

The clinic become known when British actress Kate Winslet and American actors and film producers Leonardo DiCaprio and Dwayne Johnson supported funding appeals for patients. The English actress Leah Bracknell has been mentioned as a patient of the Hallwang Clinic.

== Controversies ==
The Hallwang Clinic remains controversial. The clinic is particularly criticized for the combination of guideline-approved and complementary cancer therapies, such as hyperthermia and ozone therapy. The Hallwang Clinic is said to be the most high-profile clinic in the European private cancer industry, centred in Germany, which attracts patients from the US, the UK, Australia and the Middle East. The clinic describes itself as a pioneer in the field of personalised and precision-based oncology, though it does not publish data on patient outcomes or survival rates.

The costs at the clinic are high. More than half the £8 million raised by cancer crowdfunding in the United Kingdom was for trips to the Hallwang Clinic. One father reported being charged £600 per night for overnight stays, in addition to the charges for his son, and that two paracetamol tablets were charged at 12 euros.

In 2019, crowdfunding site GoFundMe banned fundraisers for treatments at Hallwang.

American oncologist David Gorski wrote about a case where the clinic estimated a treatment at $120,000 with 80% deposit that had to be paid privately, as the clinic does not work with insurance companies. Gorski also criticized the policy that patients are asked to not talk to the press and that the clinic "routinely couples unproven treatments with business practices that exploit the seriously ill".

== See also ==
- List of unproven and disproven cancer treatments
- Medical tourism
- Quackery
