= Paul Bottomley (scientist) =

American radiological scientist

Paul A. Bottomley
- Born: 14 March 1953 (age 73); Melbourne, Australia
- Known for: magnetic resonance imaging, magnetic resonance spectroscopy
- Scientific career
- Institutions: Johns Hopkins University
- Doctoral advisor: E. Raymond Andrew

Paul Bottomley is an American, English and Australian medical physicist. He pioneered the development of magnetic resonance imaging (MRI) that lead to modern commercial clinical 1.5 tesla MRI scanners, along with methods for performing noninvasive localized magnetic resonance spectroscopy (MRS) and applying them to the study of energy supply in human heart disease. In 2022 he retired as Russell H. Morgan Professor of Radiology and Director of the Division of MR Research at Johns Hopkins University where he is currently Professor Emeritus. He has about 200 peer-reviewed journal articles, over 50 U.S patents in MRI, MRS, and MRI-safe implantable lead technologies. He was a Founder and past member of the Board of Directors of SurgiVision Inc, a 1998 Johns Hopkins University start-up company which became MRI Interventions Inc, and is currently known as ClearPoint Neuro Inc.

== Work ==
Born in Melbourne, Australia, Bottomley earned a BSc in physics from Monash University in Australia in 1974. In 1975, he started his PhD in physics at the University of Nottingham in England, in one of the three original groups that began MRI. In Raymond Andrew's group, alongside that of Peter Mansfield, they built the first MRI system producing radiographic-quality images of the human wrist, and he performed the initial work on RF-field and power deposition in human MRI. Upon completing his PhD in 1978, he went to Johns Hopkins University in Baltimore in the USA to adapt MRI methods for spatially localizing MRS signals, initially using surface coils to demonstrate localized metabolite depletion and reversal in regional myocardial ischemia in vivo.

In 1980, Paul joined the GE Research Center in Schenectady NY. Together with William A. Edelstein and others, this group began GE's entry into MRI technology. They ordered the biggest magnet available at the time – a 1.5 tesla system – and built the first high-field whole-body MRI/MRS scanner, overcoming problems of coil design, RF penetration and signal-to-noise concerns. The results translated into the highly successful 1.5 tesla clinical MRI products of which there are well over 20,000 systems today, representing 60-70% of all systems. Using a combination of switched MRI localizing magnetic field gradients with MRS acquisition, Paul and his colleagues performed the first noninvasive localized MRS of the human heart and brain.

After starting a collaboration on heart applications with Robert Weiss at Johns Hopkins, Paul returned to Johns Hopkins University in 1994, as Professor and Director of the MR Research Division. He worked on the application of MRS to measure cardiac energy metabolism in the healthy and ischemic human heart, finding that creatine kinase energy supply was compromised in heart failure, that it declined in relation to cardiac mechanical work and that it was an independent predictor of cardiac events and death. More recent work showed that a neural network based on cardiac CK metabolic parameters alone could differentiate a number of different types of cardiac disease and severity with potentially clinically useful accuracy.

Paul has also worked on developing interventional MRI technology, specifically, tiny MRI detector coils that can be built into catheters to perform high resolution imaging of vessel wall and surrounding tissues; accelerated to perform real-time high resolution 'MRI endoscopy'; and potentially combined with extra-vascular therapy delivery. The earlier work led to the founding of the SurgiVision Inc start-up noted at top, and later, the development of MRI-safe implantable lead technology (licensed and sold as Avista™ by Boston Scientific Inc).

He has about 200 peer-reviewed papers including: highly-cited reviews that quantify MRI relaxation times ('T1' and 'T2') in normal and diseased tissues covering a broad range of low and higher field MRI systems; the 'Handbook of Magnetic Resonance Spectroscopy in vivo'; and the history of the development of localized NMR methods. He has over 50 patents, including high-field MRI (>0.7 Tesla), spin-echo MRI, 'crusher' gradients, 'fat-saturation', '3D-slab' MRI, 'point resolved spectroscopy' (PRESS), 2D spatially-selective pulses, and MRS imaging. He is a Fellow and 1989 Gold Medal recipient of the International Society of Magnetic Resonance in Medicine, 2012 Sir Peter Mansfield Lecturer; and recipient of General Electric Company's Gold Silver and Bronze patent medallions, its Dushman Award and its Coolidge Fellowship and medal. He was the 2015 Gold Medal recipient of the American Roentgen-Ray Society and the 2018-2019 Newton Abraham Visiting Professor at Oxford University U.K.

== Awards ==
- Gold Medal of the Society for Magnetic Resonance in Medicine (1989)
- GE Coolidge Fellow and Medal, (1990)
- GE Gold (1989), Silver (1985) and Bronze (1982) patent medallions
- Editors recognition awards from Radiology (1986, 1988, 1989, 1990)
- GE Dushman Award (1983)
- Associate editor, Magn Reson Med (1983-2004), deputy editor (2010-2025)
- Editorial boards of Magn Reson Imag (1982–present), Rev Sci Instrum (1986-1988), and Radiology (1991-5)
- Editorial board of Advanced Medicine (Japan: 1995–); MAGMA (2003–2006)
- Elected trustee, Soc Magn Reson Med (1986-1989), and Soc Magn Reson Imag (1982-1986)
- Fellow, Soc Magn Reson (1989)
- Gold Medal of the American Roentgen Ray Society (2015)
- Distinguished investigator, Academy of Radiology Research (2012)
- Member, National Academy of Inventors (2015)
- Soc Magn Reson Med Sir Peter Mansfield Lecturer (2012)
- NIH grant reviewer since 1979
