= Medikidz =

British medical publisher

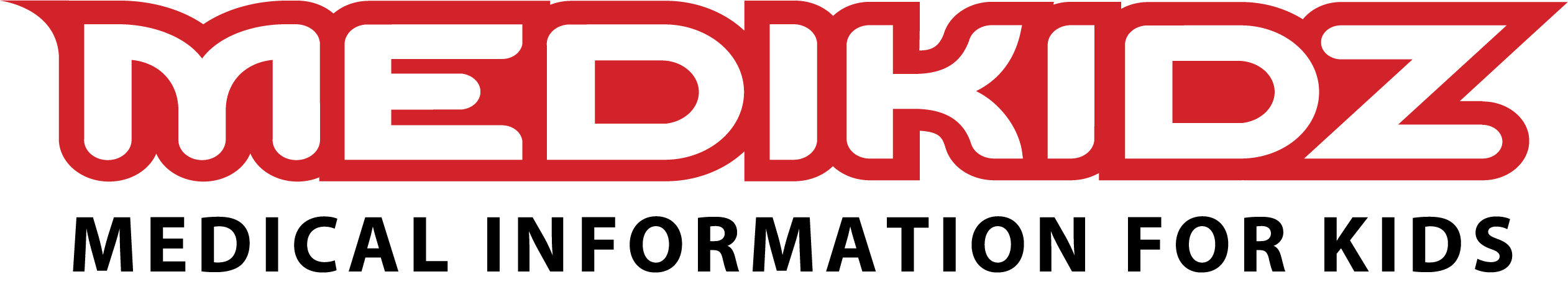
- Type: Private
- Industry: Medical Information Publisher
- Founded: September 2009
- Headquarters: New York/London
- Key people: Dr. Kate Hersov, Co-founder and CEO; Dr Columba Quigley, Chief Medical Editor
- Services: Publishing
- Number of employees: 12
- Website: www.medikidz.com/

Medikidz is a global initiative set up by doctors to explain medical information to children. The Medikidz superheroes are used to explain medical conditions, investigations, diagnoses, medicines and surgical procedures to young patients and their families – in a way that they can understand.

The company was founded in New Zealand by Kim Chilman-Blair and co-founder Kate Hersov in order to improve children's health information around the world. Currently located in New York City, and headquartered in London, there were plans for expansion into Sydney, Australia in 2014.

All Medikidz materials are written by doctors, and are co-authored by USA graphic novelists including John Taddeo and Shawn Deloache. The work is further recognised by a medical advisory board of expert healthcare professionals in the field who are used as independent peer reviewers for each of the titles in the comic book series. The content is then transformed into graphic novels by a team of artists.

== The "Medikidz" ==
The 'Medikidz' are a gang of 5 superheroes from Mediland, a giant living planet shaped like the human body. Each one is a specialist in different parts of the body. The characters are designed to be fun and appealing to young people in order to be able to entertain, as well as educate them about serious medical issues.

- Pump is the leader of the team and is the Heart specialist.
- Skindy is the Skin & Bone specialist with a robotic leg. It appears to be a screw or spring. The reason for this tragic loss is unknown
- Gastronomic is the Gastrointestinal specialist
- Chi is the Lung specialist
- Axon is the Brain specialist, with his pet robot Abacus

In each graphic novel, the team takes a child on a journey through 'Mediland' where they can learn about medical conditions, both adult and paediatric.

== Distribution ==
Over three million copies worldwide in 50 countries and in 30 languages have been distributed. Archbishop Desmond Tutu and will.i.am have publicly endorsed the Medikidz initiative.

== Medikidz Foundation ==
The charitable arm of the company, The Medikidz Foundation, has done work in Africa, most recently donating 100,000 comic books on HIV to Swaziland. The Medikidz Foundation is now due to increase the work they are doing in poorer countries, funded by the commercial arm of the business.
