= Beautyscapes =

2019 book by Ruth Holliday, Meredith Jones and David Bell

Beautyscapes: Mapping Cosmetic Surgery Tourism
- Cover of the 2019 Manchester University Press edition
- Authors: Ruth Holliday, Meredith Jones and David Bell
- Language: English
- Subjects: Sociology
- Publisher: Manchester University Press
- Publication date: 2019
- Publication place: United Kingdom
- Media type: Print (hardcover)
- Pages: 232
- Awards: Foundation for the Sociology of Health & Illness' Book of the Year Prize (2020)
- ISBN: 9781526134257

Beautyscapes: Mapping Cosmetic Surgery Tourism is a 2019 book by Ruth Holliday, Meredith Jones and David Bell, published by Manchester University Press. The book addresses international medical travel, patient-consumers who seek cosmetic surgery abroad, and the people that enable access to treatment abroad. The book received the 2020 Foundation for the Sociology of Health & Illness' Book of the Year Prize.

== Reception ==
Anna Dowrick, writing in Sociology of Health & Illness, described the book as "a good read" and wrote that "As users of healthcare services ourselves, it may forewarn a not too distant future of out of pocket spending that might involve travel to different destinations, with care bracketed according to what we can pay." Dowrick praised the book for providing "a helpful template for how to hold tension between antimonies inherent in assemblages (in this case patient/consumer, global/local and home/away), and how to make visible the different ‘flows’ that give assemblages dynamism." Dowrick summarised that the authors "challenge critiques of those who seek aesthetic enhancement as being dupes of patriarchal beauty norms".

Virginia Blum, in a review for the Times Literary Supplement, highlighted that the authors of Beautyscapes "argue that most literature on cosmetic surgery pathologizes the participants, or portrays them as ignorant of the forces that prey on their self-eteeem. Blum suggested that while Holliday, Jones, and Bell "dispute the view that plastic surgery patients are compelled by idealized images" they "provide little evidence".

=== Awards ===
- Foundation for the Sociology of Health & Illness' Book Prize (2020).
