= Therapure BioPharma Inc =

Canadian biopharmaceutical industry and biotechnology company

Therapure BioPharma Inc.
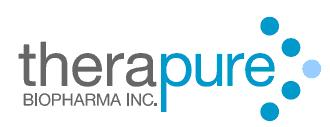
- Company type: Biotechnology
- Industry: Biopharmaceutical, Biomanufacturing, biotechnology
- Founded: 2008
- Headquarters: Mississauga, Ontario, Canada
- Key people: Nicholas Green (CEO), Rajan Puri (Director)
- Products: Therapeutic Proteins
- Number of employees: 300
- Website: http://www.therapurebio.com

Therapure BioPharma, Inc. is a Canadian biopharmaceutical industry and biotechnology company, headquartered in Mississauga, Ontario, a privately held, integrated Contract Development and Manufacturing Organization (CDMO). Founded in 2008, the firm provides a range of therapeutic protein development and manufacturing services including; technology transfer & process development, analytical development and testing, scale up and cGMP manufacturing, and aseptic fill/finish and lyophilization. As of 2010, the company has over 90 employees. In 2020, Therapure was acquired by Resilience.

== Facility ==
The 130,000 ft2 cGMP biopharmaceutical facility is a first of its kind in Canada as an article in BioBusiness indicated that Therapure has the capability to develop, manufacture, purify, and package protein therapeutics at very large and small scale. The facility was toured by Mississauga Mayor Hazel McCallion during the official launch. The great nephew of Dr. Frederick Banting, Bob Banting, indicated that "This facility will alleviate the need for Canadians to seek resources outside of the country in order to manufacture their products."
