= Consumer import of prescription drugs =

Person getting prescription drugs from a foreign country

Consumer import of prescription drugs refers to an individual person, typically a patient, getting prescription drugs from a foreign country for their own personal use in their own country.

== Import mechanisms ==
People can have drugs shipped to them from online pharmacies. They may travel internationally for the purpose of medical tourism, and purchase drugs there to be used back home.

== Causes ==
Individual consumers will only consider seeking drugs from other countries if they have some barrier to access in their own country. One barrier to access is high local prices compared to other markets. Another barrier to access could be legal restrictions preventing an individual from getting a drug they want or need.

=== International drug market prices ===
In some markets, drug prices are set or influenced by the prices in other, nearby markets. In Europe, for example, people freely and easily travel to different countries, and the price of a certain drug in one country affects the price in other, nearby countries. Having this kind of competitive exchange can keep prices low, but it can also lead to lowered drug accessibility. Sometimes a manufacturer may choose not to offer a drug in one market, to ensure success in selling the drug at a higher price in a different market.

Businesses, manufacturers and drug retailers wish to control the supply of pharmaceuticals in their own marketplace. As such, if low-cost drugs entered a market from other lower-cost territories, what might develop is pure price-based selling. The TRIPS agreement is an example of a World Trade Organization treaty which regulates how drugs can be traded in the international marketplace.

Some developing countries might receive access to lower-cost drugs through compulsory licenses. Compulsory licenses affect markets outside the country in which they are issued.

=== Variation in legality ===
Drugs which are legal in one place may not be legal in another.

== By region ==
=== Canada to United States ===
People in the United States have easy access to Canada. The quality of medicine in Canada is comparable to that of the United States. Drug prices are often much lower in Canada than in the United States. To save money, some consumers in the United States seek to purchase drugs in Canada. Different people have published different perspectives on this practice.

One major on-line supplier, Canada Drugs, announced its closure on July 13, 2018, as part of an agreement with the U.S. Department of Justice.

Two organizations, the Canadian International Pharmacy Association and the PharmacyChecker Verification Program, verify the safety and legitimacy of online pharmacies that ship from Canada to the United States.

The average savings was 81% when purchased in Canada.

=== Mexico to United States ===
In some cases, U.S. insurance companies will pay consumers of high-cost drugs to personally travel to Mexico to buy the same drugs at a much lower cost there.

== Legality of import by mail by country ==
Note that because there are no customs barriers between countries within the EU, importing from another EU country within the EU can be considered de facto legal.

Country/Territory	Legality	Notes
Germany	Illegal from outside the EU/EEA	Illegal from outside the EU/EEA without an import permit. No controls from within the EU/EEA.
Norway	Illegal	Illegal even with a prescription.
South Korea	Illegal with exceptions	Up to six bottles of prescriptions for personal use are allowed, as long as they are not controlled substances.
United Kingdom	Legal	Legal, except for controlled substances.
United States	Illegal with exceptions for prescriptions	Less than 90 days' supply, with a prescription, must be approved by the FDA
Country/Territory	Legality	Notes

== Society and culture ==
=== Petition for government reform ===
Consumers may feel that prescription drugs which are available to multiple countries to be of equivalent quality, and feel comfortable buying and using drugs by choosing to purchase from the country which offers the drugs at the lowest price.

=== Legal status ===
Governments typically oversee the import of prescription drugs so bringing a prescription drug from a foreign country could be Illegal drug trade.

== See also ==
- List of pharmacies by country
