= Zymeworks =

Canadian biotechnology company

Zymeworks Inc.
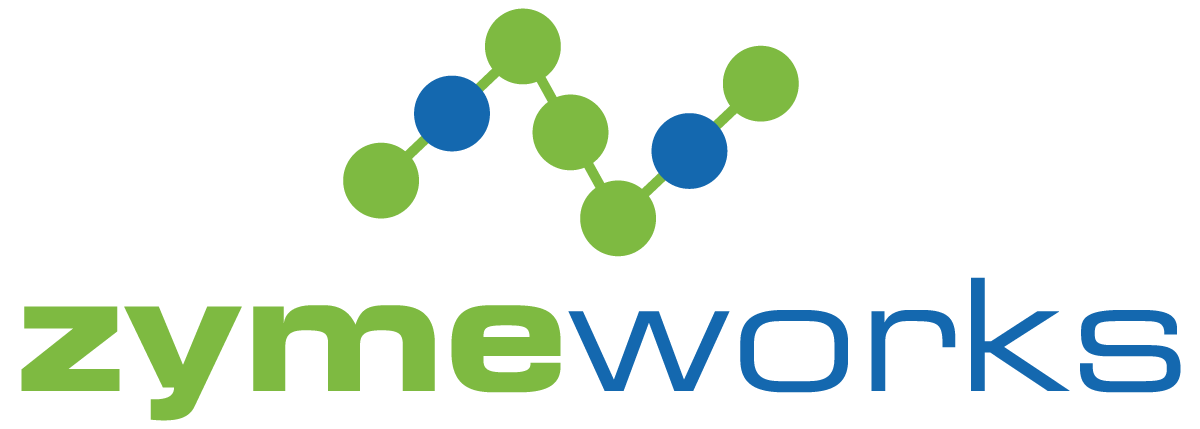
- Type: Public
- Traded as: Nasdaq: ZYME
- Industry: Biotechnology
- Founded: 2003
- Headquarters: Vancouver, British Columbia, Canada
- Key people: Kenneth Galbraith (CEO)
- Products: Pharmaceuticals
- Revenue: ▲US$106 million (2025)
- Net income: ▲ −US$81.1 million (2025)
- Number of employees: 275
- Website: www.zymeworks.com

Zymeworks Inc. is a publicly held biotechnology company based in Vancouver, British Columbia, that develops protein therapeutics for the treatment of cancer as well as for autoimmune and inflammatory diseases. The products are based upon the company's molecular modeling software for optimizing protein structure. In 2014, Zymeworks raised $44 million across various funding rounds according to PitchBook, placing it among the top 10 HealthTech businesses in the world to raise the most capital that year. In May 2017, Zymeworks held an IPO on the Toronto Stock Exchange, raising $59 million. This was the largest Canadian biotech IPO in more than a decade. By alphabetical order, Zymeworks is the last company on the Toronto Stock Exchange.

In May 2019, Zymeworks announced that GSK has expanded its 2016 licensing and collaboration agreement for the research, development and commercialization of bispecific antibodies across multiple disease areas. The extended agreement has meant that GSK can have access to Zymeworks' heavy-light chain pairing technology, which enables the development of bispecific and multifunctional therapeutics.

In September 2019, Zymeworks announced that, following their clinical trials, it has been confirmed that their ZW25 monotherapy can provide durable disease control in patients with a variety of HER2-expressing solid tumors that have progressed following standard of care treatments.

In May 2022, Zymeworks rejected an unsolicited takeover proposal from a Dubai hedge fund, All Blue Falcons FZE, an arm of All Blue Capital.

== Azymetric ==
This is an IgG1-based heterodimeric antibody scaffold that consists of two different heavy chains engineered to exclusively assemble into a single molecule, allowing bi-specific binding to two different antigens or drug targets. The Azymetric scaffold is engineered by making amino acid changes in the CH3 region of the constant Fc domain of the IgG1. This scaffold can also be engineered with tailored effector function and optimized serum half-life.

== Awards and recognition ==
- Deal of the Year, Lifesciences BC Awards, 2018
- Life Sciences Company of the Year, Lifesciences BC Awards, 2016
- Emerging company of the year – Health, BIOTECanada Gold Leaf Awards, 2015
- 12th Place, BC's Leading Innovators, 2011
- Life Science Emerging Rocket, 2009, 2010, 2011
- Early stage Company of the year – Industrial & Agriculture, BIOTECanada Gold Leaf Awards, 2009
