= Pharmaceutical industry in Canada =

The pharmaceutical industry in Canada employs approximately 30,000 people. It supplies about one third of the domestic pharmaceutical consumer market of $27 billion annually. This accounts for ~16% of yearly health expenditures. Canada had a pharmaceutical trade deficit of $8.5 billion in 2018 with exports of $11 billion and imports of $19.5 billion. The majority of large pharmaceutical companies are headquartered in Montreal, Quebec. Both Toronto and Montreal have healthy pharmaceutical industries.

== History ==
The first pharmaceutical company in Canada was founded in 1879 by E. B. Shuttleworth. in 1887, the first foreign-owned subsidiary was started in Windsor by the American firm Parke, Davis and Company. This branch-plant operation was primarily set up to take advantage of Canadian tariff laws designed to protect domestic manufacturers from foreign competition.

== Companies ==
Canada hosts several large public (Bausch Health) and private (Apotex) pharmaceutical companies as well as many subsidiaries (Buckley's) of larger international companies.
