= Bristol Myers Squibb =

American pharmaceutical company

Bristol-Myers Squibb Company

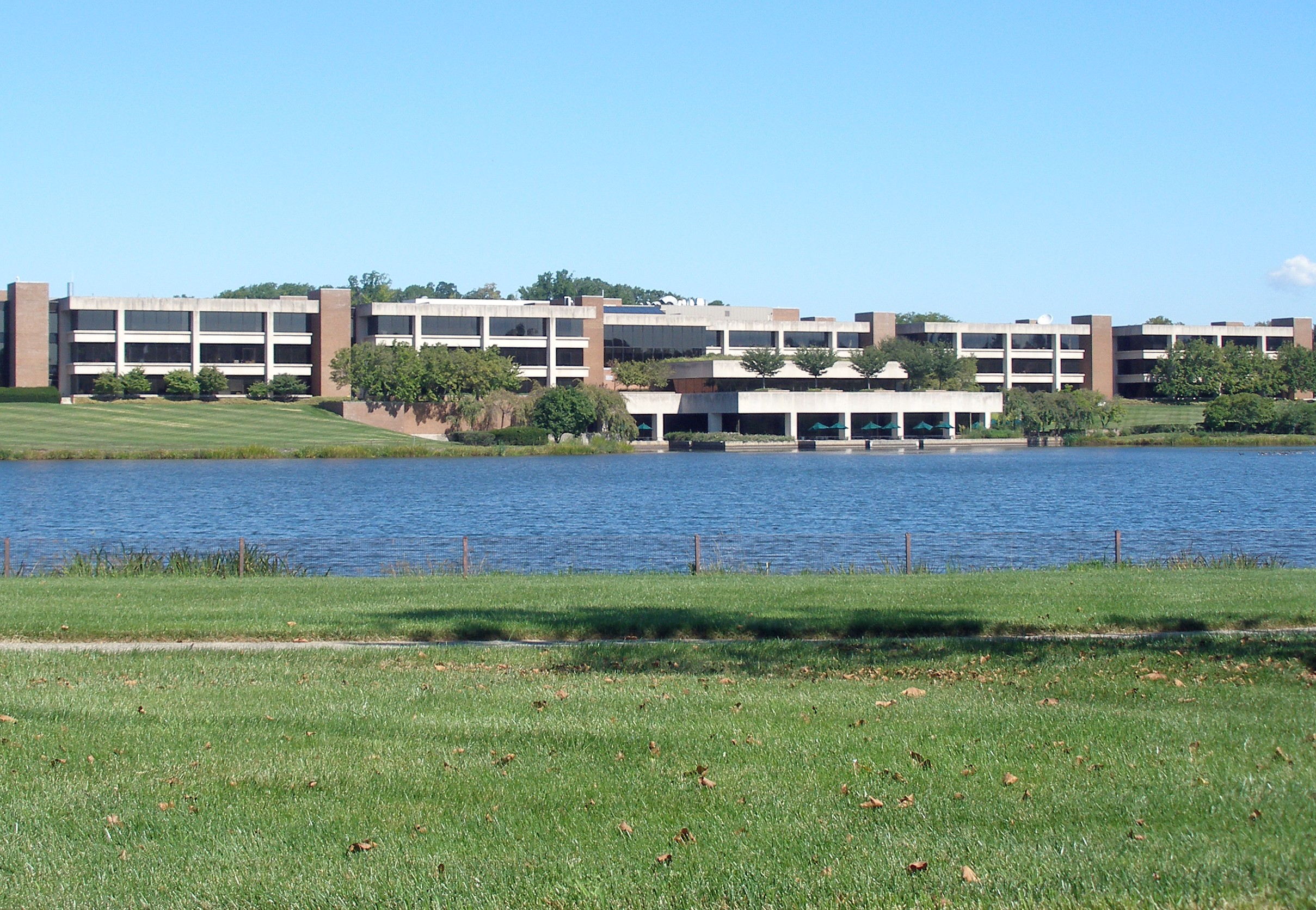
- A Bristol Myers Squibb research and development facility in Lawrence, New Jersey (corporate headquarters since July 2023)
- Trade name: Bristol Myers Squibb
- Formerly: Bristol-Myers Company (1887–1989)
- Type: Public
- Traded as: NYSE: BMY; S&P 100 component; S&P 500 component
- Industry: Pharmaceuticals
- Predecessors: Squibb Corporation (1858–1989)
- Founded: 1887; 139 years ago
- Founders: William McLaren Bristol; John Ripley Myers; E. R. Squibb
- Headquarters: Princeton, New Jersey, U.S. (registered); Lawrenceville, New Jersey, U.S. (corporate)
- Area served: Worldwide
- Key people: Chris Boerner (chairman and CEO); David Elkins (CFO)
- Revenue: ▼US$48.2 billion (2025)
- Operating income: ▲US$10.0 billion (2025)
- Net income: ▲US$7.05 billion (2025)
- Total assets: ▼US$90.0 billion (2025)
- Total equity: ▲US$18.5 billion (2025)
- Number of employees: 32,500 (2025)
- Website: bms.com

Bristol-Myers Squibb Company, doing business as Bristol Myers Squibb, is an American multinational pharmaceutical company headquartered in Princeton, New Jersey. The company's primary products are apixaban (Eliquis) for people with atrial fibrillation (30% of 2025 revenues); nivolumab (Opdivo), used to treat certain types of cancer (21% of 2025 revenues); lenalidomide (Revlimid), used to treat multiple myeloma, smoldering myeloma, and myelodysplastic syndromes (6% of 2025 revenues); abatacept (Orencia), used to treat autoimmune diseases such as rheumatoid arthritis (8% of 2025 revenues); pomalidomide (Pomalyst/Imnovid), an anti-cancer medication used for the treatment of multiple myeloma and AIDS-related Kaposi sarcoma (6% of 2025 revenues); ipilimumab (Yervoy), to treat cancer (6% of 2025 revenues); and luspatercept (Reblozyl) for the treatment of anemia in beta thalassemia and myelodysplastic syndromes (5% of 2025 revenues). In 2025, 69% of the company's revenues came from the United States.

The company is ranked 94th on the Fortune 500 and 173rd on the Forbes Global 2000.

BMS's primary research and development (R&D) sites are located in Lawrence, New Jersey (formerly Squibb, near Princeton), Summit, New Jersey, formerly HQ of Celgene, New Brunswick, New Jersey; Redwood City, California; and Seville in Spain, with other sites in Devens and Cambridge, Massachusetts; Braine-l'Alleud, Belgium; Tokyo, Japan; Hyderabad; Bangalore, India and Wirral, United Kingdom. BMS previously had an R&D site in Wallingford, Connecticut (formerly Bristol-Myers).

== History ==
=== Squibb ===
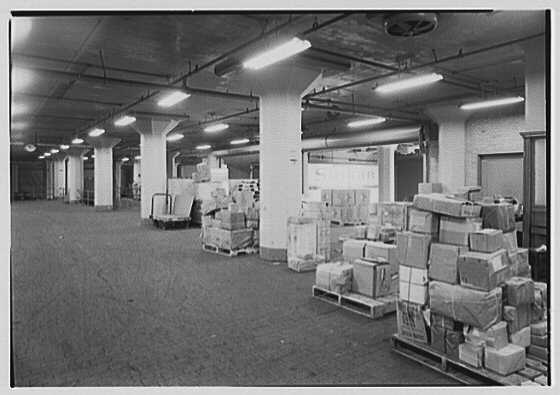
E.R. Squibb & Son facility in Long Island City, New York, in 1948

The Squibb corporation was founded in 1858 by Edward Robinson Squibb in Brooklyn, New York after resigning from his assistant surgeon post from the U.S. Navy. The company started operating in a small brick laboratory in Brooklyn. It was reported that the nascent company almost closed upon its opening as the facility burned down on Christmas Eve of 1858. While the laboratory was destroyed, a group of doctors and surgeons helped Squibb reopen in 1859 by subscribing $2,100. The business survived and flourished.

Squibb was known as an advocate of quality control and high purity standards early within the pharmaceutical industry. He went on to self-publish an alternative to the U.S. Pharmacopeia titled Squibb's Ephemeris of Materia Medica, after failing to convince the American Medical Association to incorporate higher purity standards.

Materia Medica, Squibb products, and Edward Squibb's opinion on the fundamentals of pharmacy are found in many medical papers of the late 1800s. The American Journal of Pharmacy published more than one hundred papers of Squibb's research surrounding the industry. When Squibb's health deteriorated, management was passed down to his sons, Charles and Edward. By 1895, the company officially became E.R. Squibb & Sons.

The sons of Edward Squibb sold the company to Lowell M. Palmer and Theodore Weicker in 1905, who incorporated the company. Around this time, the Squibb logo was developed, which represented the company's products of "uniformity, purity, efficacy, and reliability based on research."

Squibb Corporation served as a major supplier of medical goods to the Union Army during the American Civil War, providing portable medical kits containing morphine, surgical anesthetics, and quinine for the treatment of malaria (which was endemic in most of the Eastern United States at that time).

In 1944, Squibb opened the world's largest penicillin plant in New Brunswick, New Jersey.

=== Bristol-Myers ===
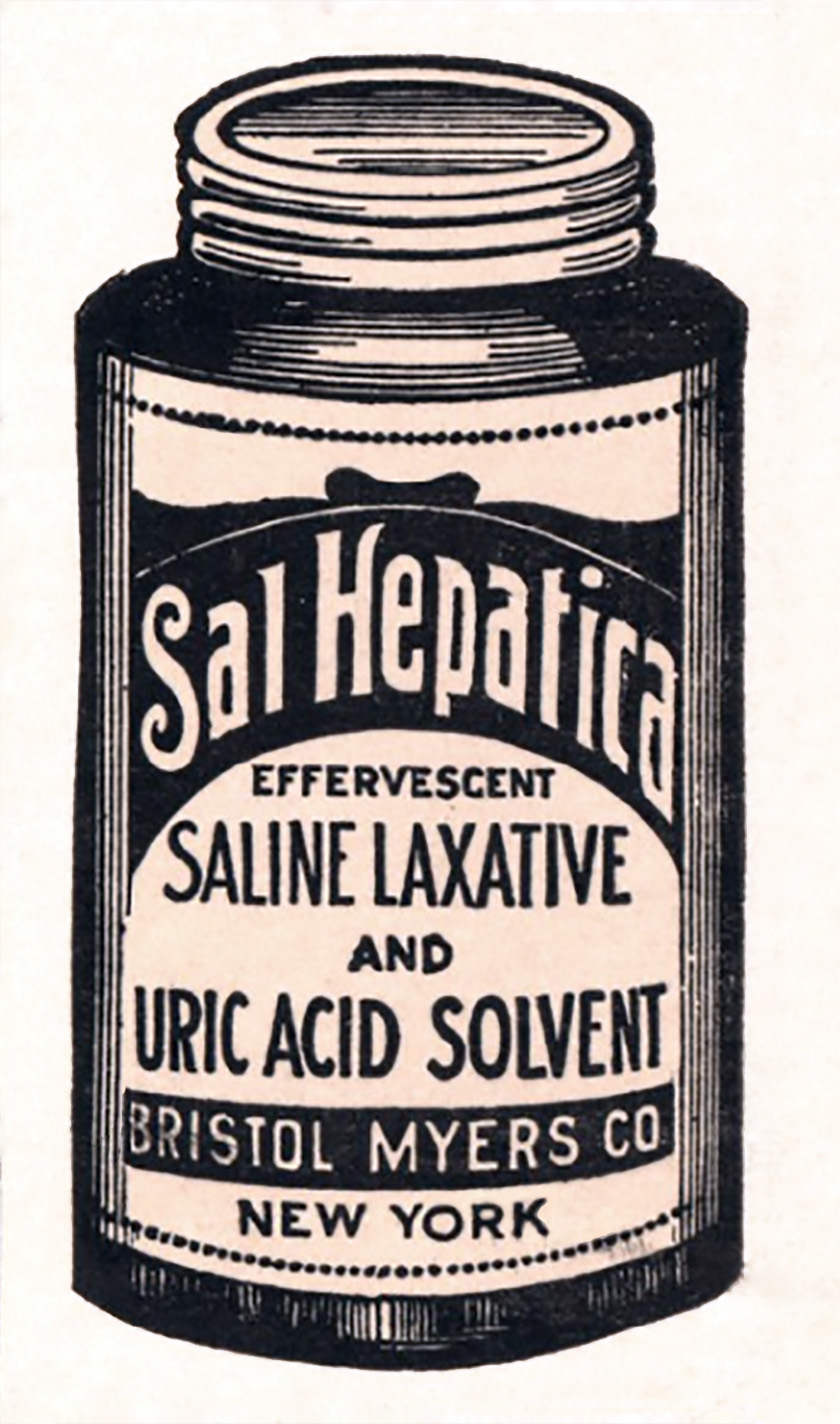
Sal Hepatica (1909)

In 1887, Hamilton College graduates William McLaren Bristol and John Ripley Myers purchased the Clinton Pharmaceutical company of Clinton, New York. In May 1898, they decided to rename it Bristol, Myers and Company. Following Myers' death in 1899, Bristol changed the name to the Bristol-Myers Corporation.

During the 1890s, the company introduced its first nationally recognized product Sal Hepatica, a laxative mineral salt, followed by Ipana toothpaste in 1901. Other divisions were Clairol (hair colors and haircare) and Drackett (household products such as Windex and Drano).

In 1943, Bristol-Myers acquired Cheplin Biological Laboratories, a producer of acidophilus milk in East Syracuse, New York, and converted the plant to produce penicillin for the World War II Allied forces. After the war, the company renamed the plant Bristol Laboratories in 1945 and entered the civilian antibiotics market, where it faced competition from Squibb.

Penicillin production at the East Syracuse plant ended in 2005, when it became less expensive to produce overseas. As of 2010, the facility was used for the manufacturing process development and production of other biologic medicines for clinical trials and commercial use.

=== Merger ===
In 1989, Bristol-Myers and Squibb merged and became Bristol-Myers Squibb.

In 1999, then-U.S. President Bill Clinton awarded Bristol-Myers Squibb the National Medal of Technology, the nation's highest recognition for technological achievement, "for extending, and enhancing human life through innovative pharmaceutical research and development and for redefining the science of clinical study through groundbreaking and hugely complex clinical trials that are recognized models in the industry."

=== 2000 to 2010 ===
Bristol-Myers Squibb logo from 1989 to 2020

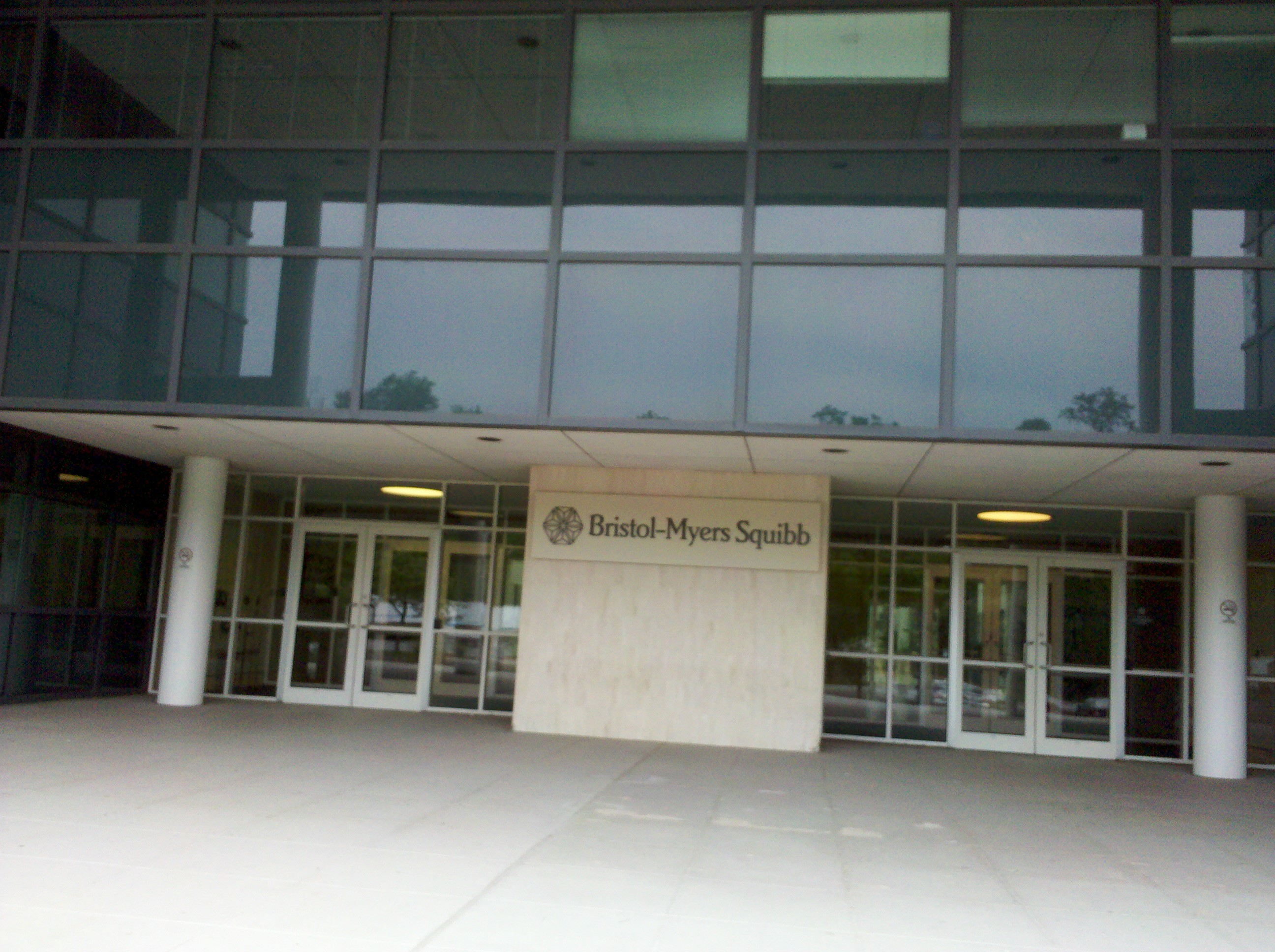
The company has a number of facilities in New Jersey; this one is on the border between West Windsor and Princeton.

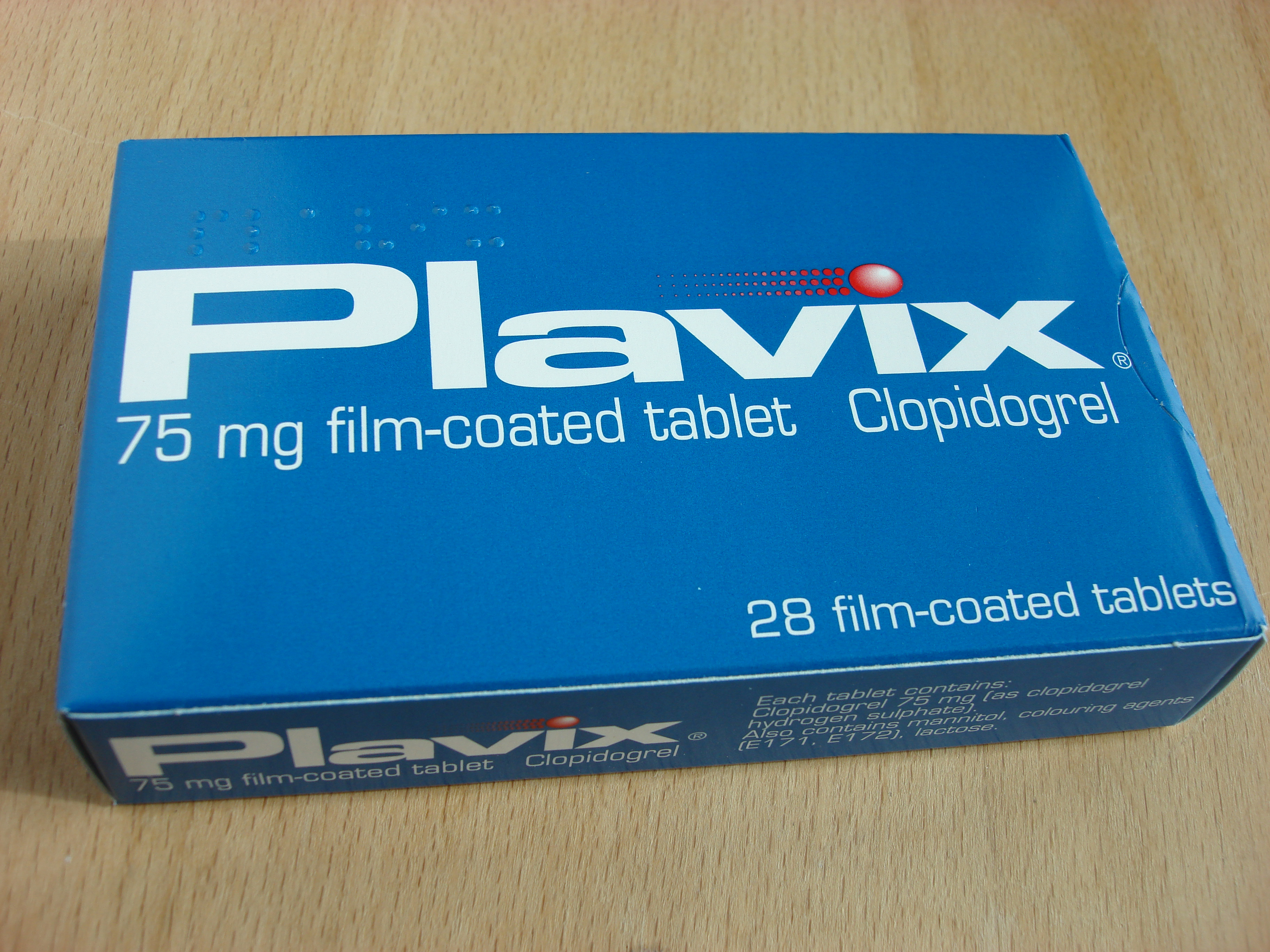

In July 2006, the FBI raided the company's corporate offices on charges of collusion centered on the distribution of Plavix On 12 September 2006, the monitor, former Federal Judge Frederick B. Lacey, urged the company to remove then-CEO Peter Dolan over the Plavix dispute. Later that day, BMS announced that Dolan would indeed step down. The deferred prosecution agreement expired in June 2007 and the Department of Justice did not take any further legal action against the company for matters covered by the DPA. Under CEO Jim Cornelius, who was CEO following Dolan until May 2010, all executives involved in the "channel-stuffing" and generic competition scandals have since left the company.

In 2009, the company began a major restructuring focusing on the pharmaceutical business and biologic products, along with productivity initiatives and cost-cutting and streamlining business operations through a multiyear program of on-going layoffs. This was part of a business strategy launched in 2007 to transform the company from a large, diversified pharmaceutical company to a specialty biopharma company, which also included the closure of half of its manufacturing facilities. As another cost-cutting measure, Bristol-Myers Squibb also reduced health-care subsidies for retirees and planned to freeze their pension plan at the end of 2009.

Lamberto Andreotti was named CEO in 2010; he had previously served as president and COO

=== 2010-present ===
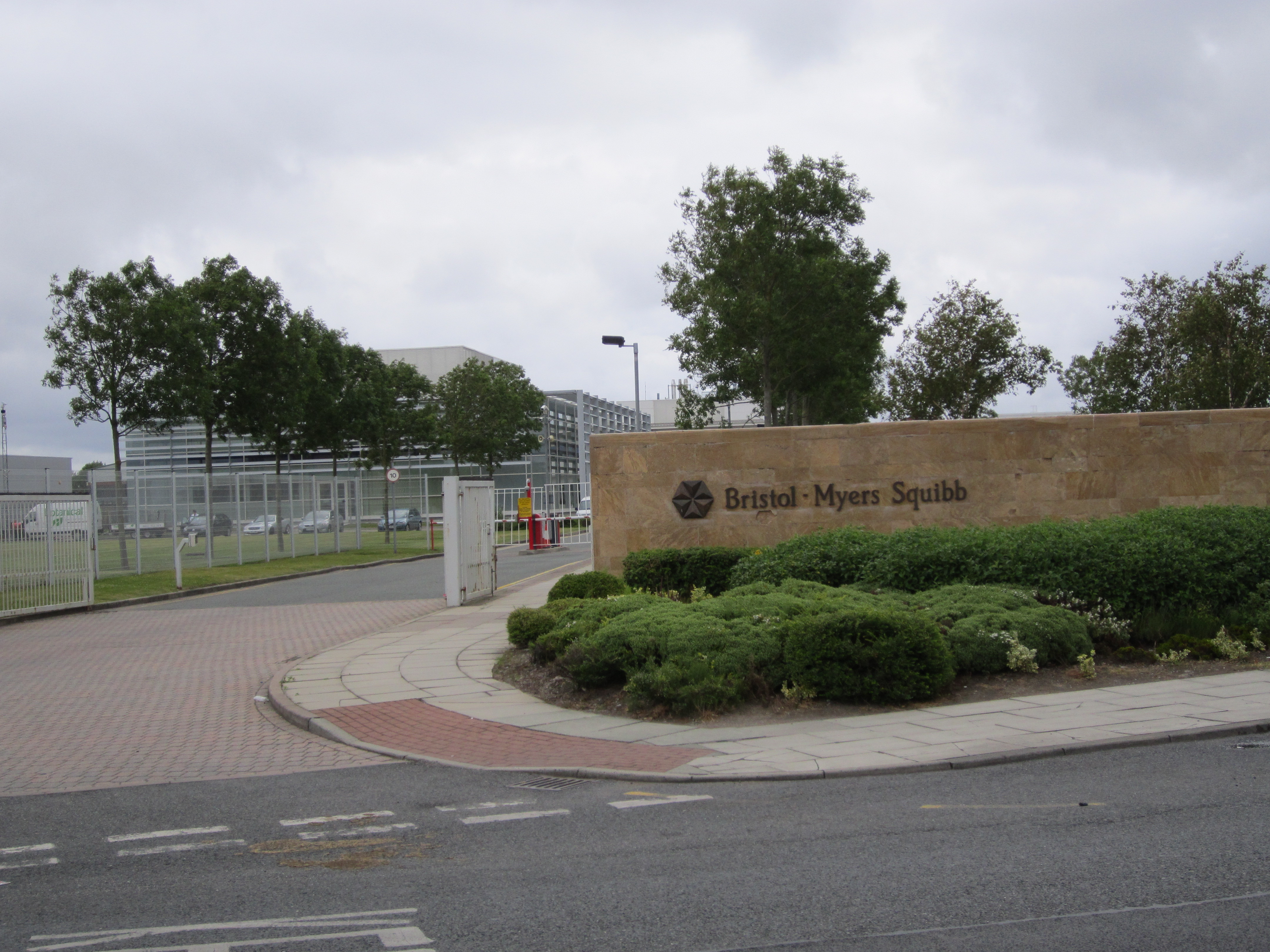
Bristol-Myers Squibb facility in Wirral, England

In 2010, Lou Schmukler joined Bristol-Myers Squibb as the president of global product development and design. Schmukler led the team that completed the company's strategic transformation to a specialty biopharmaceutical company that had begun in 2007. As of 2011, the company had a dozen manufacturing facilities and six product development sites.

The company was ranked as the best drug company of 2013 by Forbes magazine.

In December 2014, the company received FDA approval for the use of the PD-1 inhibitor nivolumab (Opdivo) in treating patients whose skin cancer cannot be removed or have not responded to previous drug therapies. In February 2015, the company initiated a research partnership with Rigel Pharmaceuticals which could generate more than $339 million. In March, the company obtained an exclusive opportunity to both licence and commercialise PROSTVAC, Bavarian Nordic's phase III prostate-specific antigen targeting cancer immunotherapy. Bavarian Nordic would receive an upfront payment of $60 million and incremental payments up to $230 million, if the overall survival of test patients exceeds that seen in Phase II tests. Bavarian could also receive milestone payments of between $110 million and $495 million, dependent on regulatory authorization, and these payments have the potential to total up to $975 million.

In May 2015, Giovanni Caforio became CEO of the company; Caforio was formerly the company's COO and succeeded Lamberto Andreotti upon his retirement. Andreotti subsequently succeeded James Cornelius as Executive Chairman upon his retirement.

== Corporate acquisitions and divestments as Bristol Myers Squibb ==
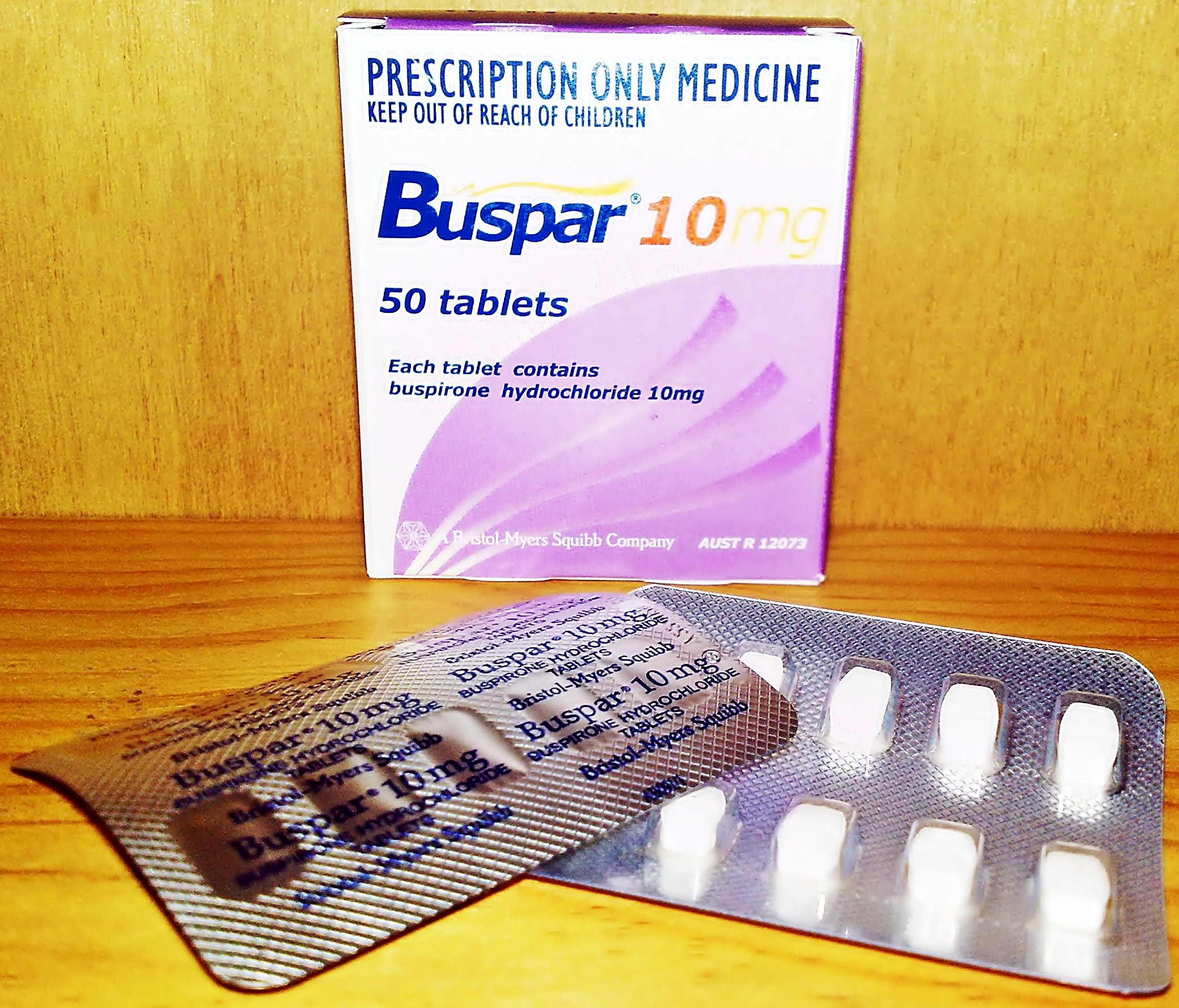
Buspirone tablets

In August 2009, during a major restructuring activity, BMS acquired the biotechnology firm Medarex as part of the company's "String of Pearls" strategy of alliances, partnerships, and acquisitions. In November 2009, Bristol Myers Squibb announced that it was "splitting off" Mead Johnson Nutrition by offering BMY shareholders the opportunity to exchange their stock for shares in Mead Johnson. According to Bristol Myers Squibb, this move was expected to further sharpen the company's focus on biopharmaceuticals.

In October 2010, the company acquired ZymoGenetics, securing an existing product, as well as pipeline assets in hepatitis C, cancer, and other therapeutic areas.

Bristol Myers Squibb agreed to pay around $2.5 billion in cash to buy Inhibitex Inc. in attempt to compete with Gilead/Pharmasset to produce hepatitis C drugs. The settlement will be finished in 2 months for its Inhibitex's shareholders acceptance of 126% premium price of its price over the previous 20 trading days ended on 6 January. On 29 June, BMS extended its portfolio of diabetes treatments when it agreed to buy Amylin Pharmaceuticals for around US$5.3 billion in cash and pay US$1.7 billion to Eli Lilly to cover Amylin's debt and its outstanding collaboration-related obligations. AstraZeneca, which already collaborated on several diabetes treatments with BMS, agreed to pay US$3.4 billion in cash for the right to continue development of Amylin's products. Two years later, the company divested Amylin to AstraZeneca.

In April 2014, BMS announced its acquisition of iPierian for up to $725 million.

In February 2015, the company acquired Flexus Biosciences for $1.25 billion. As part of this deal, BMS will gain full rights to Flexus' lead small molecule IDO1-inhibitor, F001287. In November, the company acquired the cardiovascular disease drug developer Cardioxyl for up to $2.075 billion. The deal strengthens the BMS' critical pipelines with the phase II candidate for acute decompensated heart failure, CXL-1427.

In March 2016, the company announced it would acquire Padlock Therapeutics for up to $600 million. In early July, the company announced it would acquire Cormorant Pharmaceuticals for $520 million, boosting BMS' oncology offering through Cormorants monoclonal antibody targeted against interleukin-8.

In August 2017, the company acquired IFM Therapeutics for $300 million upfront, with contingency payments of $1.01 billion due on certain milestones – allowing BMS to better compete against Merck & Co's cancer rival treatment, Keytruda.

In November 2019, the company acquired Celgene for $74 billion or $95 billion including debt. To gain regulatory approval, Amgen acquired Otezla from Celgene for $13.4 billion. The Celgene acquisition aimed to be a refresher to the company's pipeline, helping to overcome from declining sales of Opdivo relative to competitor Keytruda. BMS investors Wellington Management Company and Starboard Value opposed the merger; however, 75% of its shareholders voted to approve.

In July 2019, the company sold its consumer health business, UPSA, to Taisho Pharmaceutical. UPSA focused product delivery on France and the rest of Europe. As early as 2005, the company had divested individual consumer products, and its US- and Canada-focused consumer products business.

In February 2020, BMS and partner Biomotiv launched a new company called Anteros Pharmaceuticals, which focuses on creating inflammation and fibrosis medicines. In August, the business announced it would acquire Forbius and its TGF-beta 1 & TGF-beta 3 inhibitors. In October, BMS announced it would acquire cardiology company MyoKardia for $13.1 billion ($225 per share) gaining control of mavacamten, a cardiovascular drug for obstructive hypertrophic cardiomyopathy (HCM), and the development of two key treatments: danicamtiv (MYK-491) and MYK-224.

In August 2022, BMS acquired Turning Point Therapeutics for $4.1 billion in cash, helping to boost its complement of cancer drugs, specifically repotrectinib. That same month, the company announced it would be investing $180m in French AI company Owkin, to design potentially more precise and efficient clinical trials. The collaboration will initially focus on cardiovascular diseases, and has the potential to extend into projects in other therapeutic areas.

In August 2023, Bristol Myers Squibb partnered with Cellares for the robotic production of CAR-T treatments of which it has two approved. In September 2023, BMS announced it would pay Zenas BioPharma $50m upfront for a strategic license and collaboration to develop and commercialise obexelimab, a novel, bi-functional antibody for autoimmune diseases.

In January 2024, BMS acquired Mirati Therapeutics, an American biotechnology company that develops targeted therapies for the treatment of cancer, for $4.8 billion, and an additional $1 billion in milestone payment.

In March 2024, BMS acquired Karuna Therapeutics for $14 billion. The acquisition included Karuna's lead asset, KarXT, an investigational muscarinic antipsychotic combination of Xanomeline and Trospium for the treatment of schizophrenia in adults.

In February 2024, the company acquired RayzeBio for approximately $4.1 billion.

In September 2024, the Food and Drug Administration approved Cobenfy, the first novel type of treatment for schizophrenia in 70 years.

=== List of mergers and acquisitions ===
The following is an illustration of the company's major mergers and acquisitions and historical predecessors:

- Bristol-Myers Squibb (Formed by the merger of Squibb Corporation (Est 1858) and Bristol-Myers (Est 1887))
  - Adnexus Therapeutics
  - ConvaTec
  - Kosan Biosciences
  - Medarex (Acq 2009)
  - ZymoGenetics (Acq 2010)
  - Amira Pharmaceuticals
  - Inhibitex Inc (Acq 2012)
  - Amylin Pharmaceuticals (Acq 2012 jointly with AstraZeneca)
  - iPierian (Acq 2014)
  - Flexus Biosciences (Acq 2015)
  - Cardioxyl (Acq 2015)
  - Padlock Therapeutics (Acq 2016)
  - Cormorant Pharmaceuticals (Acq 2016)
  - IFM Therapeutics (Acq 2017)
  - Celgene (Acq 2019)
    - Signal Pharmaceuticals, Inc (Acq 2000)
    - Anthrogenesis (Acq 2002)
    - Pharmion Corporation (Acq 2008)
    - Gloucester Pharmaceuticals (Acq 2009)
    - Abraxis BioScience Inc (Acq 2010)
    - Avila Therapeutics, Inc (Acq 2012)
    - Quanticel (Acq 2015)
    - Receptos (Acq 2015)
    - EngMab AG (Acq 2016)
    - Delinia (Acq 2017)
    - Impact Biomedicines (Acq 2018)
    - Juno Therapeutics, Inc. (Acq 2018)
      - AbVitro (Acq 2016)
      - RedoxTherapies (Acq 2016)
  - Forbius (Acq 2020)
  - MyoKardia (Acq 2020)
  - Turning Point Therapeutics (Acq 2022)
  - Mirati Therapeutics (Acq 2024)
  - Karuna Therapeutics (Acq 2024)
  - RayzeBio (Acq 2024)
  - Orbital Therapeutics, Inc. (Acq 2025)

== Finances ==
Year	Revenue in bil. US$	Net income in bil. US$	Total assets in bil. US$	Price per share in US$	Employees
2005	18.60	3.00	28.14	14.60	
2006	16.20	1.59	25.58	15.24	
2007	15.62	2.17	25.93	18.98	
2008	17.72	5.25	29.49	14.95	
2009	18.81	10.60	31.00	15.90	
2010	19.48	3.09	31.08	19.76	
2011	21.24	3.70	32.97	23.41	
2012	17.62	1.96	35.90	28.04	
2013	16.39	2.56	38.60	38.39	28,000
2014	15.88	2.00	33.75	47.03	25,000
2015	16.56	1.57	31.75	59.63	25,000
2016	19.43	4.45	33.71	59.73	25,000
2017	20.78	1.00	33.55	55.88	23,700
2018	22.56	4.92	34.99	51.98	23,300
2019	26.15	3.44	129.44	52.23	30,000
2020	42.52	−9.02	118.48	62.03	30,250
2021	46.39	6.99	109.31	62.35	32,200
2022	46.16	6.33	96.82	71.95	34,300

== Pharmaceuticals ==
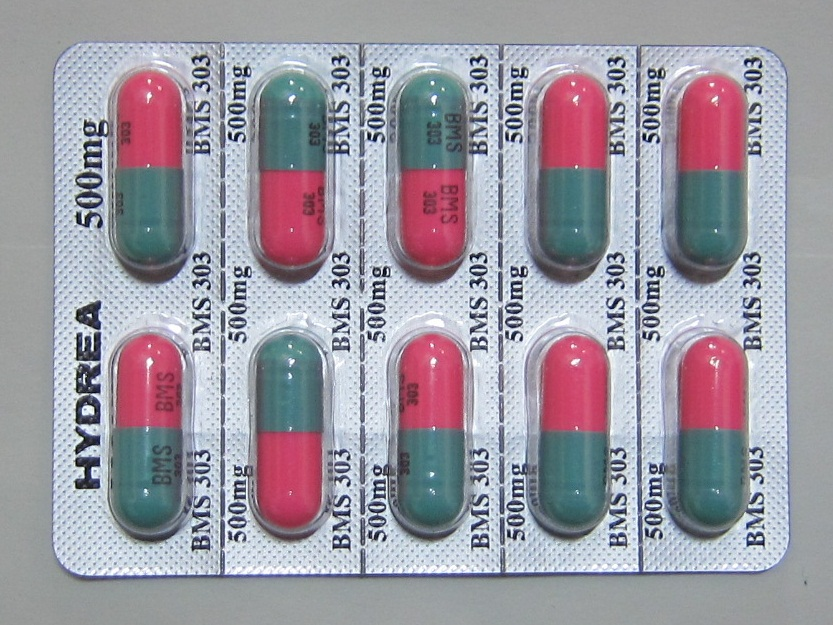
Hydrea (hydroxycarbamide)

The following is a list of key pharmaceutical products:

Cardiovascular diseases

- Avalide (irbesartan/hydrochlorothiazide) – comarketed with Sanofi
- Avapro (irbesartan) – comarketed with Sanofi
- Camzyos (Mavacamten)
- Coumadin (warfarin)
- Eliquis (apixaban) – comarketed with Pfizer
- Plavix (clopidogrel) – comarketed with Sanofi
- Pravachol (pravastatin)

Diabetes mellitus

- Bydureon (exenatide extended-release) – marketed by BMS only in some countries
- Byetta (exenatide) – marketed by BMS only in some countries, such as Russian Federation
- Farxiga/Forxiga (dapagliflozin)
- Glucophage (metformin) – marketed by BMS only in USA
- Glucophage XR (metformin extended release) – marketed by BMS only in USA
- Glucovance (Glyburide/metformin) – marketed by BMS only in USA
- Kombiglyze XR/Komboglyze (saxagliptin/metformin extended release) – comarketed with AstraZeneca
- Onglyza (saxagliptin) – comarketed with AstraZeneca

Infectious diseases, including HIV infection and associated conditions

- Atripla (efavirenz/emtricitabine/tenofovir disoproxil fumarate) – comarketed with Gilead Sciences
- Azactam (aztreonam)
- Baraclude (entecavir)
- Daklinza (daclatasvir)
- Evotaz (atazanavir/cobicistat)
- Megace (megestrol acetate)
- Reyataz (atazanavir)
- Sustiva/Stocrin (efavirenz)
- Videx (didanosine)
- Videx EC (didanosine delayed-release)
- Zerit (stavudine)

Inflammatory disorders

- Kenalog-10 (triamcinolone acetonide)
- Kenalog-40 (triamcinolone acetonide)

Oncology

- Abecma (idecabtagene vicleucel)
- BiCNU (carmustine)
- Breyanzi (lisocabtagene maraleucel)
- CeeNU (lomustine)
- Droxia/Hydrea (hydroxycarbamide)
- Empliciti (Elotuzumab)
- Erbitux (cetuximab)
- Etopophos (etoposide)
- Ixempra (ixabepilone)
- Lysodren (mitotane)
- Megace (megestrol acetate)
- Opdivo (nivolumab) is a programmed death receptor blocking antibody used for the treatment of unresectable or metastatic melanoma and metastatic squamous non-small-cell lung carcinoma. In contrast to traditional chemotherapies and targeted anti-cancer therapies, which exert their effects by direct cytotoxic or tumor growth inhibition, nivolumab acts by inducing the immune system to attack the tumor.
- Sprycel (dasatinib)
- Taxol (paclitaxel). At one time, BMS held the solitary contract to harvest the bark of endangered yew trees on United States territory for the manufacture of chemotherapy drug paclitaxel (Taxol). Current paclitaxel production comes from renewable sources. BMS also held the original paclitaxel license, but there are now multiple generic producers.
- Vumon (teniposide)
- Yervoy (ipilimumab)

Psychiatry

- Abilify (aripiprazole comarketed with Otsuka Pharmaceutical)
- Cobenfy (xanomeline/trospium chloride)

Autoimmune disorders (e.g. rheumatoid arthritis)

- Orencia (abatacept)
- Sotyktu (deucravacitinib)

Transplant rejection

- Nulojix (belatacept)

=== Out of production ===
- Sal Hepatica
- Ipana

=== Divested brands ===
(Former Bristol-Myers brands, now divested)

- Bufferin
- Excedrin
- Ban Deodorant
- Vitalis (hair tonic)
- Ammens (medicated powder)
- Final Net (hair spray)
- Comtrex (cold relief capsules)
- Keri (lotion)

=== Products under development ===
Beclabuvir

The following is a selective list of investigational products under development, as of 2023:

- Luspatercept - phase III: On 28 August 2023, BMS' drug Reblozyl has received FDA label expansion, making it a first-line treatment option for anemia in adults with low- to intermediate-risk myelodysplastic syndromes (MDS) who may need regular blood transfusions. This decision, supported by data from the Phase III COMMANDS study, highlights Reblozyl's superiority over erythropoiesis-stimulating agents (ESAs) in treating MDS-related anemia, potentially driving the drug's sales towards its $4 billion sales goal by 2030. The drug's efficacy in patients both with and without specific symptoms further widens its scope of application.
- Beclabuvir (BMS-791325) – phase III
- BMS-906024 – phase I
- BMS-955176 – phase II
- Brivanib alaninate (BMS-582664) – development terminated
- Elotuzumab (BMS-901608) – phase III
- Fostemsavir (BMS-663068) – approved in the United States in July 2020
- Lirilumab (BMS-986015)
- Lulizumab pegol (BMS-931699) – phase II

== Contributions ==
Notable organizations to which Bristol-Myers Squibb has provided funding include the Institute for Advanced Study, Northern Ontario School of Medicine, Population Health Research Institute (PHRI) at McMaster University Medical School, University of Toronto, University of Washington, Centre for Addiction and Mental Health, Princess Margaret Cancer Centre, Scarborough Health Network, SickKids, Sinai Health System, Sunnybrook Health Sciences Centre, National Geographic Society, National Press Foundation, American Society of Hematology, European Society of Cardiology, Canadian Association of Emergency Physicians, Canadian Rheumatology Association, and Multiple Sclerosis International Federation.

Notable lobbying organizations to which the company has contributed include BIOTECanada, Innovative Medicines Canada, International Federation of Pharmaceutical Manufacturers & Associations, National Health Council, Pharmaceutical Advertising Advisory Board, and Pharmaceutical Research and Manufacturers of America.

== Legal issues ==
In 2002, the company was sued by 29 states for illegally maintaining a monopoly on Taxol, its cancer treatment and was sued in a separate case for trying to keep a generic version of BuSpar off the market. It paid $125 million to settle the Taxol case and a total of $670 million to settle both cases.

Also in 2002, Bristol-Myers Squibb was involved in an accounting scandal that resulted in a significant restatement of revenues from 1999 to 2001. The restatement was the result of an improper booking of sales related to "channel stuffing" as the practice of offering excess inventory to customers to create higher sales numbers. The company settled with the United States Department of Justice and Securities and Exchange Commission for $150 million. In 2004, the company restated its financial results for the previous 5 years. As part of a deferred prosecution agreement, the company was placed under the oversight of a monitor appointed by the U.S. attorney in New Jersey. In addition, the former head of the Pharma group, Richard Lane, and the ex-CFO, Fred Schiff, were indicted for federal securities violations.

Bristol-Myers Squibb was one of the named defendants in a $1 billion lawsuit for infecting hundreds of Guatemalans with syphilis during the Guatemala syphilis experiments. In 2022, the company was dismissed from the lawsuit, though the reason for the dismissal was not publicly disclosed.

== See also ==
- List of biotech and pharmaceutical companies in the New York metropolitan area
