= IFM =

IFM may refer to:

== Organisations ==
- IFM Therapeutics, a US-based pharmaceutical company
- Institute of Fisheries Management, a UK non-profit organisation
- Institut Fizik Malaysia (Malaysian: 'Malaysian Physics Institute'), a Malaysian professional body
- Institute for Media and Communication Policy, a German research institution
- ifm group, a German automation technology company
- Intergalactic FM, an online radio station based in the Netherlands
- Institut Français de la Mode (French: 'French Institute of Fashion'), a French higher-education institution
- iFM, Philippine radio network owned by Radio Mindanao Network

== Science and technology ==
- Immunofluorescence microscopy, a technique used for light microscopy
- Incremental funding methodology, an approach to software development
- Forest fire weather index, (French: indice forêt météo) a risk estimate
- Interaction-free measurement, in quantum mechanics

== Other ==
- Independent forest monitoring, in forest law enforcement
- International Formula Master, a form of Motor Racing
- IFM Investors, an Australian investment management company

== See also ==
- International Falcon Movement – Socialist Educational International, a federation of international progressive youth education organisations
