= C5H7NO4S =

The molecular formula C_{5}H_{7}NO_{4}S may refer to:

- Cimlanod
- Tidiacic
