= Delocamten =

Cardiac myosin inhibitor developed by Bristol Myers Squibb

Clinical data
- Other names: MYK-224; BMS-986435

Identifiers
- IUPAC name: (6S,7S)-6-Fluoro-7-(2-fluoro-5-methylphenyl)-3-(oxan-4-yl)-5,6,7,8-tetrahydro-1H-pyrido[2,3-d]pyrimidine-2,4-dione
- CAS Number: 2417411-02-8
- PubChem CID: 146586175
- ChemSpider: 129910026
- UNII: IE5886BN8T
- KEGG: D12949

Chemical and physical data
- Formula: C_{19}H_{21}F_{2}N_{3}O_{3}
- Molar mass: 377.392 g·mol^{−1}
- 3D model (JSmol): Interactive image
- SMILES: CC1=CC(=C(C=C1)F)[C@H]2[C@H](CC3=C(N2)NC(=O)N(C3=O)C4CCOCC4)F
- InChI: InChI=1S/C19H21F2N3O3/c1-10-2-3-14(20)12(8-10)16-15(21)9-13-17(22-16)23-19(26)24(18(13)25)11-4-6-27-7-5-11/h2-3,8,11,15-16,22H,4-7,9H2,1H3,(H,23,26)/t15-,16-/m0/s1; Key:NPPSFOUMKWFJKX-HOTGVXAUSA-N

Delocamten (development code MYK-224) is a small-molecule cardiac myosin inhibitor developed by Bristol Myers Squibb for hypertrophic cardiomyopathy.
