= Giulio Andreotti =

Prime Minister of Italy (1972–73; 1976–79; 1989–92)

Senator for life Giulio Andreotti OMI SMOM OCSG OESSH
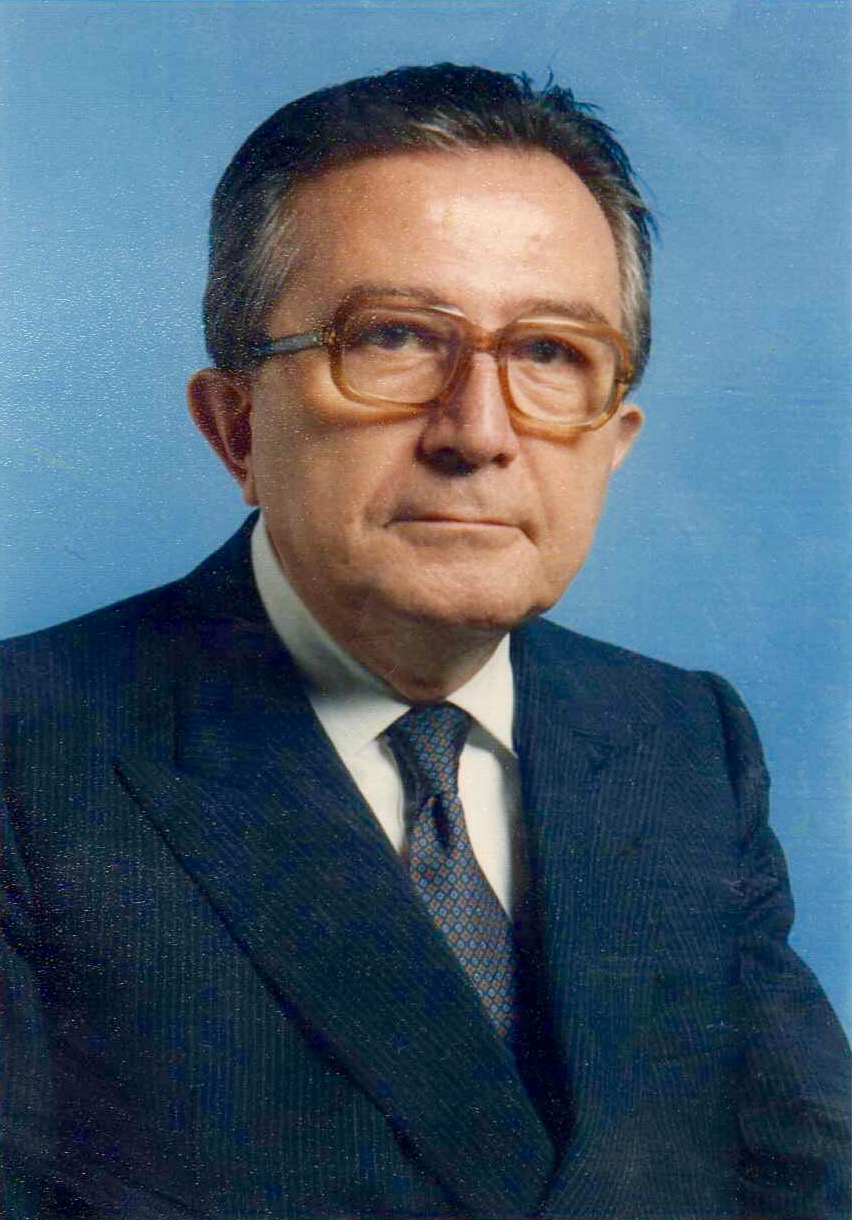
- Official portrait, 1987

Prime Minister of Italy
- In office 23 July 1989 – 28 June 1992
- President: Francesco Cossiga; Oscar Luigi Scalfaro
- Deputy: Claudio Martelli
- Preceded by: Ciriaco De Mita
- Succeeded by: Giuliano Amato
- In office 30 July 1976 – 5 August 1979
- President: Giovanni Leone; Sandro Pertini
- Deputy: Ugo La Malfa
- Preceded by: Aldo Moro
- Succeeded by: Francesco Cossiga
- In office 18 February 1972 – 8 July 1973
- President: Giovanni Leone
- Deputy: Mario Tanassi
- Preceded by: Emilio Colombo
- Succeeded by: Mariano Rumor
Ministerial offices
Minister for Cultural Heritage and Environment
In office 13 April 1991 – 28 June 1992
Prime Minister	Himself
Preceded by	Ferdinando Facchiano
Succeeded by	Alberto Ronchey
Minister of State Holdings
In office 26 December 1990 – 28 June 1992
Prime Minister	Himself
Preceded by	Franco Piga
Succeeded by	Giuseppe Guarino
Minister of Foreign Affairs
In office 4 August 1983 – 23 July 1989
Prime Minister	Bettino Craxi; Amintore Fanfani; Giovanni Goria; Ciriaco De Mita
Preceded by	Emilio Colombo
Succeeded by	Gianni De Michelis
Minister of the Interior
In office 11 May 1978 – 13 June 1978
Prime Minister	Himself
Preceded by	Francesco Cossiga
Succeeded by	Virginio Rognoni
In office 19 January 1954 – 10 February 1954
Prime Minister	Amintore Fanfani
Preceded by	Amintore Fanfani
Succeeded by	Mario Scelba
Minister of Budget and Economic Planning
In office 23 November 1974 – 30 July 1976
Prime Minister	Aldo Moro
Preceded by	Antonio Giolitti
Succeeded by	Tommaso Morlino
Minister of Defence
In office 15 March 1974 – 23 November 1974
Prime Minister	Mariano Rumor
Preceded by	Mario Tanassi
Succeeded by	Arnaldo Forlani
In office 16 February 1959 – 24 February 1966
Prime Minister	Antonio Segni; Fernando Tambroni; Amintore Fanfani; Giovanni Leone; Aldo Moro
Preceded by	Antonio Segni
Succeeded by	Roberto Tremelloni
Minister of Industry, Commerce and Crafts
In office 24 February 1966 – 13 December 1968
Prime Minister	Aldo Moro; Giovanni Leone
Preceded by	Edgardo Lami Starnuti
Succeeded by	Mario Tanassi
Minister of Treasury
In office 2 July 1958 – 16 February 1959
Prime Minister	Amintore Fanfani
Preceded by	Giuseppe Medici
Succeeded by	Fernando Tambroni
Minister of Finance
In office 6 July 1955 – 2 July 1958
Prime Minister	Antonio Segni; Adone Zoli
Preceded by	Roberto Tremelloni
Succeeded by	Luigi Preti
Secretary of the Council of Ministers
In office 1 June 1947 – 19 January 1954
Prime Minister	Alcide De Gasperi; Giuseppe Pella
Preceded by	Paolo Cappa
Succeeded by	Mariano Rumor
Parliamentary offices
Member of the Senate of the Republic
Life tenure 1 June 1991 – 6 May 2013
Appointed by	Francesco Cossiga
Member of the Chamber of Deputies
In office 8 May 1948 – 31 May 1991
Constituency	Rome–Viterbo–Latina–Frosinone
Member of the Constituent Assembly
In office 25 June 1946 – 31 January 1948
Constituency	Rome–Viterbo–Latina–Frosinone

Personal details
- Born: 14 January 1919 Rome, Kingdom of Italy
- Died: 6 May 2013 (aged 94) Rome, Italy
- Party: Christian Democracy (1942–1994)
- Other political affiliations: Italian People's Party (1994–2001); European Democracy (2001–2002); Independent (2002–2008); Union of the Centre (2008–2013)
- Spouse: Livia Danese (m. 1945)
- Children: 4, including Lamberto
- Education: Sapienza University of Rome
- Profession: Politician; journalist; lawyer
- Andreotti's voice On a sculpture installed outside the Berlaymont building Recorded 23 January 1991

Giulio Andreotti (US: /ˌɑːndreɪˈɒti/ AHN-dray-OT-ee; Italian: [ˈdʒuːljo andreˈɔtti]; 14 January 1919 – 6 May 2013) was an Italian politician and statesman who served as the 41st prime minister of Italy in seven governments (1972–1973, 1976–1979, and 1989–1992). He was leader of the Christian Democracy party and its conservative faction; he was the sixth-longest-serving prime minister since the Italian unification and the second-longest-serving post-war prime minister. Andreotti is widely considered the most powerful and prominent politician of the First Republic.

Beginning as a protégé of Alcide De Gasperi, Andreotti achieved cabinet rank at a young age and occupied all the major offices of the state over the course of a 40-year political career, being seen as a reassuring figure by the civil service, the business community, and the Vatican. Domestically, he contained inflation following the 1973 oil crisis, founded the National Healthcare Service (Sistema Sanitario Nazionale) and combated terrorism during the Years of Lead. In foreign policy, he guided Italy's European Union integration and established closer relations with the Arab world. Admirers of Andreotti saw him as having mediated political and social contradictions, enabling the transformation of a substantially rural country into the world's fifth-largest economy. Critics said he had done nothing to challenge a system of patronage that had led to pervasive corruption. Andreotti staunchly supported the Vatican and a capitalist structure and opposed the Italian Communist Party. Following the popular Italian sentiment of the time, he supported the development of a strong European community playing host to neoliberal economics. He was not opposed to the implementation of the European Social Fund and the European Regional Development Fund in building the European economy.

At the height of his career as a statesman, Andreotti was subjected to criminal prosecutions and charged with colluding with Cosa Nostra. Courts managed to prove that he was undoubtedly linked with them until 1980; however, the case was closed due to past statutes of limitations. The most sensational allegation came from prosecutors in Perugia, who charged him with ordering the murder of a journalist. He was found guilty at trial, which led to complaints that the justice system had "gone mad". After being acquitted of all charges, in part due to statute-barred limitations, Andreotti remarked: "Apart from the Punic Wars, for which I was too young, I have been blamed for everything that's happened in Italy."

In addition to his prime ministerial posts, Andreotti served in numerous ministerial positions, among them as Minister of the Interior (1954 and 1978), Minister of Finance (1955–1958), Minister of Treasury (1958–1959), Minister of Defence (1959–1966 and 1974), Minister of Budget and Economic Planning (1974–1976), and Minister of Foreign Affairs (1983–1989), and was a senator for life from 1991 until his death in 2013. He was also a journalist and author. Andreotti was sometimes called Divo Giulio (from Latin Divus Iulius, "Divine Julius", an epithet of Julius Caesar after his posthumous deification), or simply Il divo.

== Background and attributes ==
Andreotti, the youngest of three children, was born on 14 January 1919 in Rome. His father, who died when Giulio was two, was a primary school teacher from Segni, a small town in Lazio; after a few years his sister Elena also died. Andreotti attended the Liceo Torquato Tasso in Rome and graduated in law at the University of Rome, with a mark of 110/110.

Andreotti showed some ferocity as a youth, once stubbing out a lit taper in the eye of another altar boy who was ridiculing him. His mother was described as not very affectionate. An aunt is said to have advised him to remember that few things in life are important and never to over-dramatise difficulties. As an adult, he was described as having a somewhat unusual demeanour for an Italian politician, being mild-mannered and unassuming. Andreotti did not use his influence to advance his children to prominence, despite being widely considered the most powerful person in the country for decades. "See all, tolerate much, and correct one thing at a time" was a quote that emphasised what has been called his "art of the possible" view of politics.

Andreotti was known for his discretion and retentive memory, and also a sense of humour, often placing things in perspective with a sardonic quip. Andreotti's personal support within the Christian Democrats was limited, but he could see where the mutual advantage for apparently conflicting interests lay and put himself at the centre of events as mediator. Though not a physically imposing man, Andreotti navigated political waters through conversational skill.

== Early political career ==
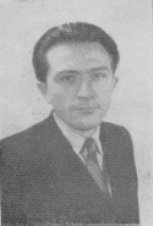
Andreotti in 1946

Andreotti did not shine at his school and started work in a tax office while studying law at the University of Rome. In this period he became a member of the Italian Catholic Federation of University Students (FUCI), the only non-fascist youth organization which was allowed by the regime of Benito Mussolini. Its members included many of the future leaders of Christian Democracy.

In 1938, while researching the papal navy in the Vatican library, he met Alcide De Gasperi, who had been given sanctuary by the Pope. De Gasperi asked Andreotti if he had nothing better to do with his time, inspiring him to become politically active. Speaking of De Gasperi, Andreotti said, "He taught us to search for compromise, to mediate."

In July 1939, while Aldo Moro was president of FUCI, Andreotti became director of its magazine Azione Fucina. In 1942, when Moro was enrolled in the Italian Army, Andreotti succeeded him as president of FUCI, a position he held until 1944. During his early years, Andreotti suffered violent migraines that forced him to make use of psychoactive drugs sporadically and opiates. During World War II, Andreotti wrote for the Rivista del Lavoro, a fascist propaganda publication, but was also a member of the then-clandestine newspaper Il Popolo.

In July 1943, Andreotti contributed, along with Mario Ferrari Aggradi, Paolo Emilio Taviani, Guido Gonella, Giuseppe Capogrossi, Ferruccio Pergolesi, Vittore Branca, Giorgio La Pira, Giuseppe Medici and Moro, to the creation of the Code of Camaldoli, a document planning of economic policy drawn up by members of the Italian Catholic forces. The Code served as inspiration and guideline for economic policy of the future Christian Democrats. In 1944, he became a member of the National Council of the newborn Christian Democracy party. After the end of the conflict, he became responsible for the party's youth organisation.

=== Chamber of Deputies and government ===
In 1946, Andreotti was elected to the Constituent Assembly of Italy, the provisional parliament which had the task of writing the new Italian constitution. His election was supported by Alcide De Gasperi, founder of the modern DC, of whom Andreotti became a close assistant and advisor; the two politicians became close friends despite their very different characters. However, De Gasperi later described Andreotti as a man "so capable in everything that he could become capable of anything". In 1948, he was elected to the newly formed Chamber of Deputies to represent the constituency of Rome–Viterbo–Latina–Frosinone, which remained his stronghold until the 1990s.

Andreotti began his government career in 1947 when he became Secretary of the Council of Ministers in the cabinet of his patron De Gasperi. The appointment was also supported by Giovanni Battista Montini, who later would become Pope Paul VI. During the office, Andreotti had wider-ranging responsibilities than many full ministers, which caused some envy. Andreotti's main undertaking was representing the interests of Frosinone in the province of Lazio. Lazio would continue to serve as Andreotti's geographical base of power later in his political career.

=== Influence on culture ===
As the state undersecretary in charge of entertainment in 1949, Andreotti established import limits and screen quotas, and provided loans to Italian production firms. The measures aimed to prevent American productions from dominating the market against Neorealist films, a genre that exhibitors complained lacked stars and was held in low esteem by the public. As he phrased it, there were to be 'Less rags, more legs'. Raunchy comedies and historical dramas with voluptuous toga-clad actresses became the staple of the Italian film industry. The screenplays were vetted to ensure that state funds were not used to prop up commercially unsustainable films, thereby creating a form of preproduction censorship. It was intended that Italian studios use part of their profits for high-quality films;

However, Vittorio De Sica's Umberto D., which depicted the lonely life of a retired man, could only strike government officials as a dangerous throwback, due to the opening scene featuring police breaking up a demonstration of old pensioners and the ending scene featuring Umberto's aborted suicide attempt. In a public letter to De Sica, Andreotti castigated him for his "wretched service to his fatherland".

=== 1950s and 1960s ===
In 1952, ahead of local elections in the municipality of Rome, Andreotti gave proof of his diplomatic skills and gained credibility. Andreotti persuaded De Gasperi not to establish a political alliance with the neo-fascist Italian Social Movement, as Pope Pius XII asked, to prevent a Communist victory.

As Secretary, Andreotti contributed to the re-formation of the Italian Olympic Committee, which had been disbanded after the fall of the Fascist regime. In 1953, among other things, he promoted the so-called "Andreotti's veto" against foreign football players in Italian Serie A.

After De Gasperi's resignation and retirement in August 1953, Andreotti remained Secretary of the Council under the short-lived premiership of Giuseppe Pella.

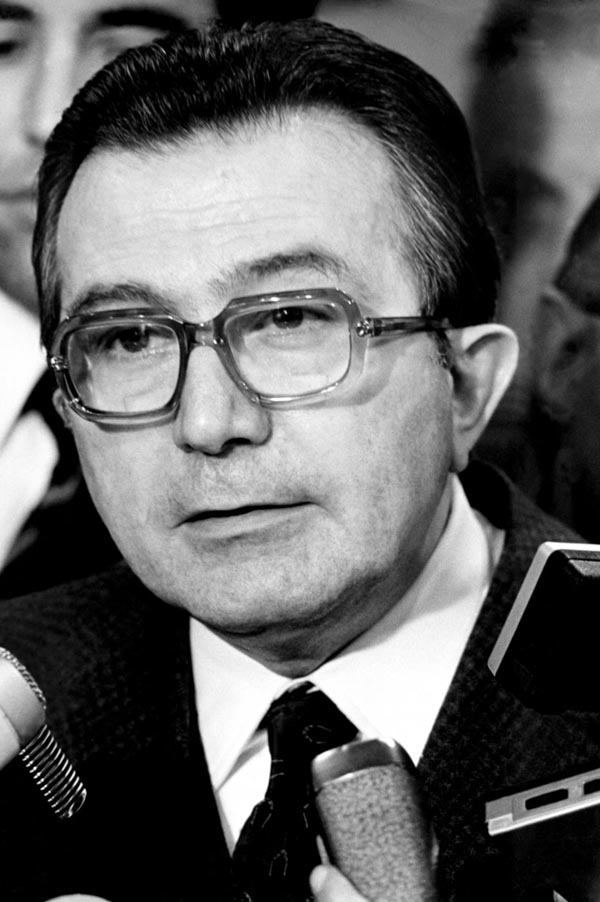
Andreotti during the 1960s

In 1954, Andreotti became Minister of the Interior in the first government of Amintore Fanfani. From July 1956 to July 1958, he was appointed Finance Minister in the cabinets of Antonio Segni and Adone Zoli. In the same period, Andreotti started forming a corrente (unofficial political association, or a faction) within the Christian Democracy party, the largest party in Italy. His corrente was supported by the Roman Catholic right wing. It started its activity with a press campaign accusing Piero Piccioni, son of the deputy national secretary of the DC, Attilio Piccioni, of the murder of fashion model Wilma Montesi at Torvaianica. After the defeat of De Gasperi's old followers in the DC National Council, Andreotti helped another newly formed corrente, the Dorotei, to oust Amintore Fanfani, who was the leader of the left wing of the party, as Prime Minister of Italy and National Secretary of the DC. On 20 November 1958 Andreotti, then Minister of Treasury, was appointed president of the organizing committee of the 1960 Summer Olympics to be held in Rome.

In the early 1960s, Andreotti was Minister of Defence, and was widely considered the de facto leader of the right-wing Christian Democratic opposition to Fanfani and Moro's strategy. In this period, the revelation that the Secret Service had compiled dossiers on virtually every public figure in the country resulted in the SIFAR affair. Andreotti ordered the destruction of the dossiers; but before the destruction, Andreotti provided the documents to Licio Gelli, the Venerable Master of the clandestine lodge Propaganda Due (P2).

Andreotti was also involved in the Piano Solo scandal, an envisaged plot for an Italian coup in 1964 requested by the then-President of the Italian Republic Antonio Segni. It was prepared by the commander of the Carabinieri, Giovanni de Lorenzo, at the beginning of 1964 in close collaboration with the Italian secret service (SIFAR), CIA secret warfare expert Vernon Walters, William Harvey, then-chief of the CIA station in Rome, and Renzo Rocca, director of the Gladio units within the military secret service SID.

In 1968, Andreotti was appointed leader of the parliamentary group of Christian Democracy, a position he held until 1972.

== First term as prime minister ==
In 1972, with Andreotti's first term as prime minister began a period when he was often seen as the éminence grise of governments even when not premier. He remained in office in two consecutive centre-right cabinets in 1972 and 1973. His first cabinet failed in obtaining the confidence vote and he was forced to resign after only 9 days; this government has been the one with the shortest period of fullness of powers in the history of the Italian Republic.

A snap election was called for May 1972, and Christian Democracy, led by Andreotti's ally Arnaldo Forlani, remained stable with around 38% of the votes, as did the Communist Party, with the same 27% as in 1968. Andreotti, supported by secretary Forlani, tried to continue his centrist strategy, but his attempt only lasted a year. The cabinet fell due to the withdrawal of the external support of the Italian Republican Party on the matter of local television reform.

=== Social policies ===
Andreotti's approach owed little to a belief that market mechanisms could be left to work without interference. He used price controls on essential foodstuffs and various social reforms to reach an understanding with organised labour.

A devout Catholic, Andreotti was on close terms with six successive pontiffs. He occasionally gave the Vatican unsolicited advice which was often heeded. He updated the relationship of Roman Catholicism to the Italian state in an accord he presented to parliament. It put the country on a more secular basis: abolishing Roman Catholicism as the state religion, making religious instruction in public schools optional, and having the Church accept Italy's divorce law in 1971. Andreotti opposed legal divorce and abortion, but despite his party's opposition, he couldn't avoid the legalization of abortion in May 1978.

=== Foreign policy ===
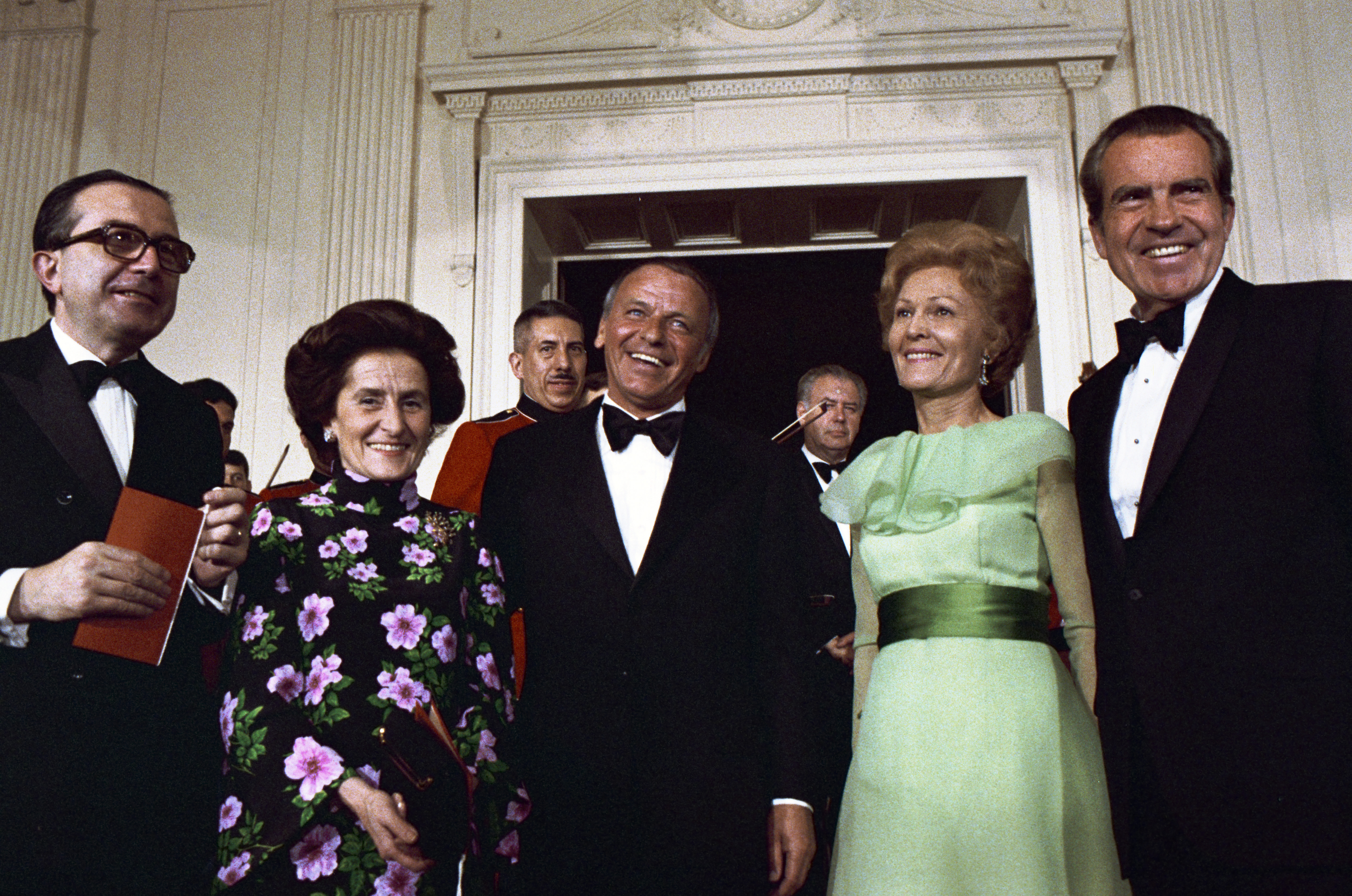
Andreotti with Richard Nixon and Frank Sinatra, 1973

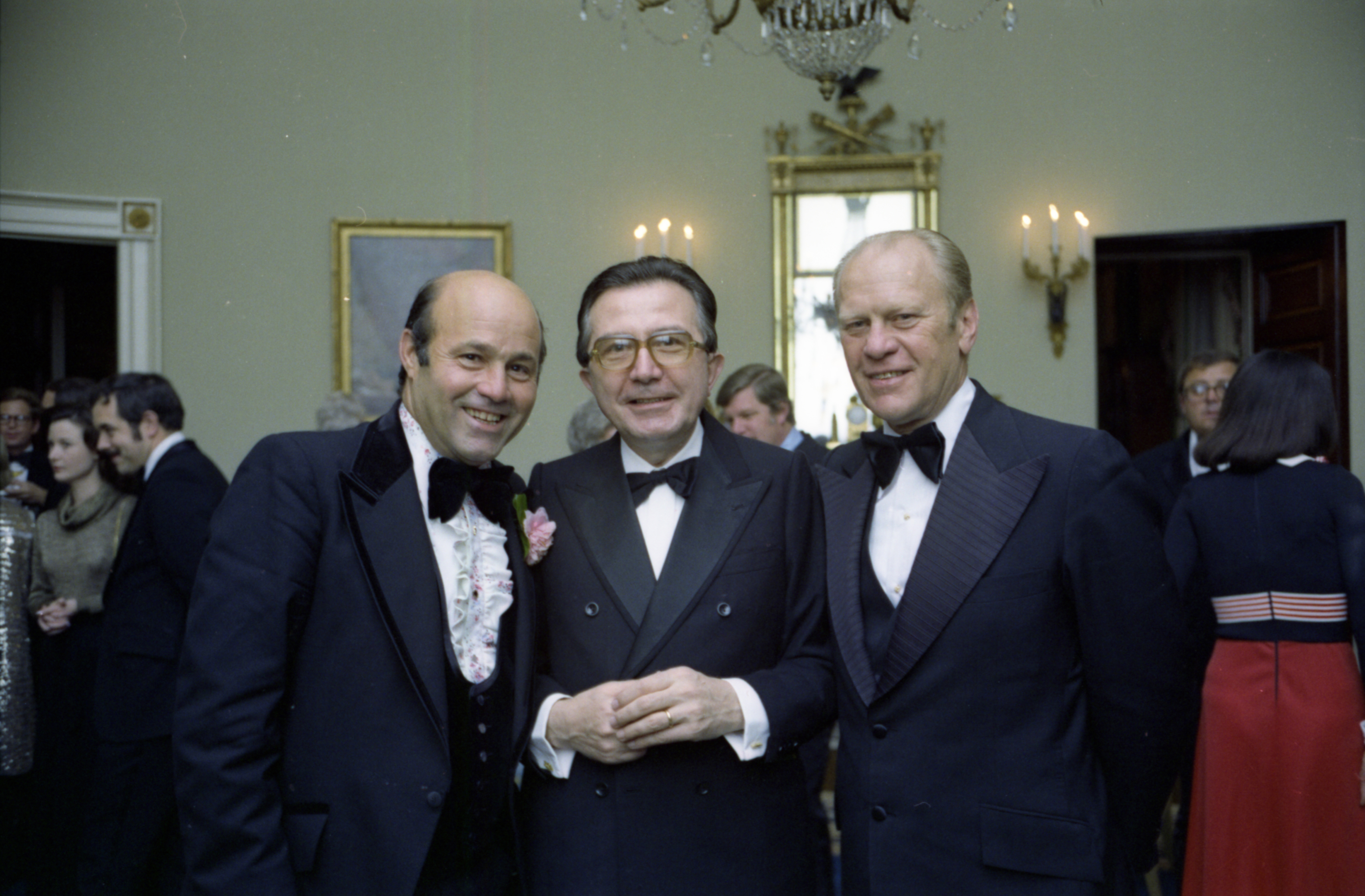
Andreotti with Gerald Ford and Joe Garagiola, 1976

Andreotti was a strong NATO supporter and was invited to America by the U.S. President Richard Nixon in 1973. A year earlier, he paid an official visit to the Soviet Union, the first one by an Italian Prime Minister in over a decade. During his premiership, Italy opened and developed diplomatic and economic relationships with Arab countries of the Mediterranean Basin, and supported business and trade between Italy and the Soviet Union.

== Second term as prime minister ==
After his resignation, Andreotti served as Minister of Defence in the government of Mariano Rumor and as Minister of Budget in the cabinets of Aldo Moro. In 1976, the Italian Socialist Party left the centre-left government of Moro. The ensuing general elections saw the growth of the Italian Communist Party (PCI), and the DC kept only a minimal advantage as the relative majority party in Italy, which was then suffering from an economic crisis and terrorism. After the success of his party, the Communist secretary Enrico Berlinguer approached DC's left-leaning leaders, Moro and Fanfani, with a proposal to bring forward the so-called Historic Compromise, a political pact proposed by Moro which would see a government coalition between DC and PCI for the first time. Andreotti, known as a staunch anti-communist, was called in to lead the first experiment in that direction: his new cabinet, formed in July 1976, included only members of his own Christian Democratic party but had the indirect support of the communists.

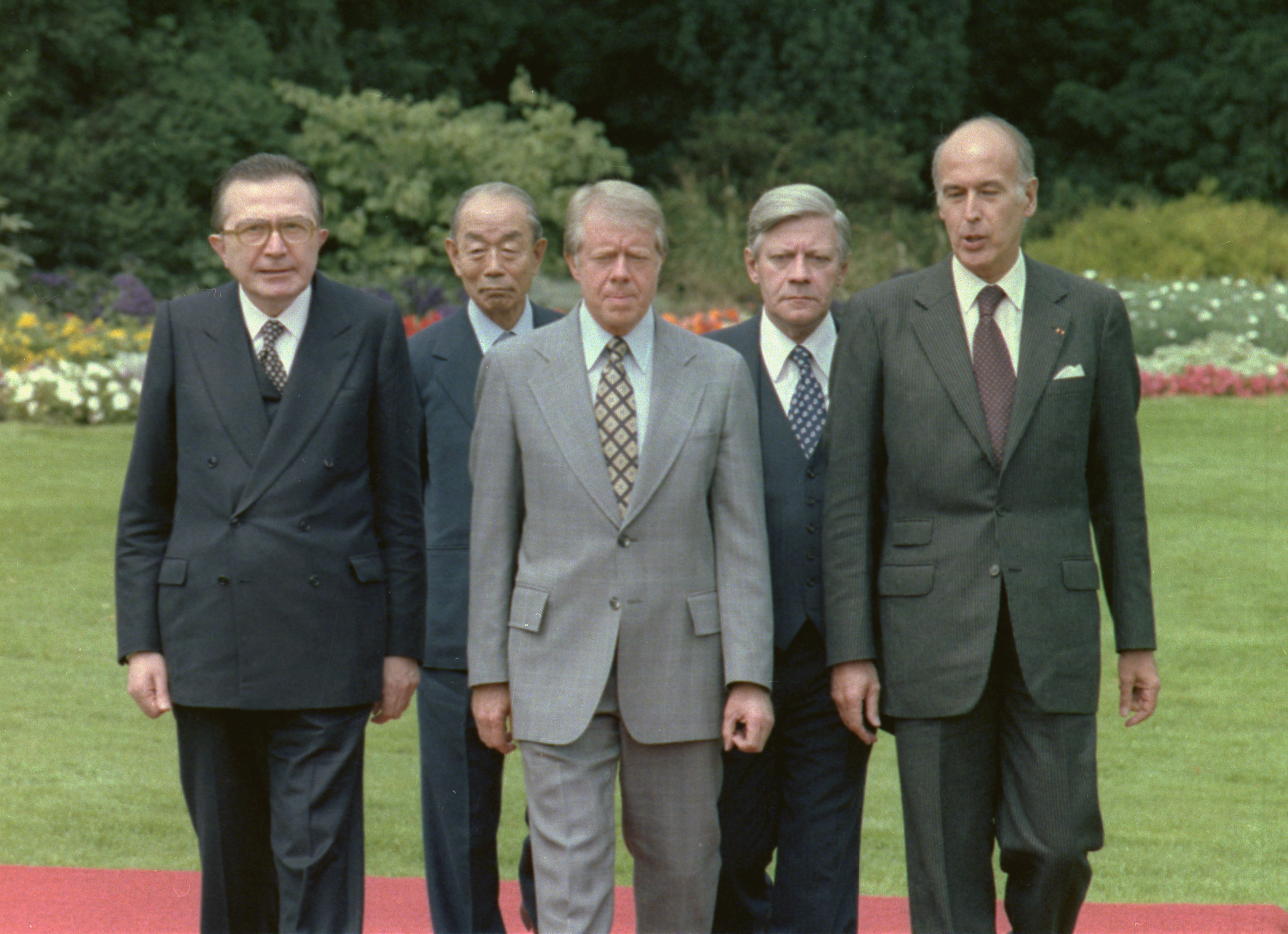
Andreotti with G7 leaders at the 4th G7 summit in Bonn, 1978

Andreotti's third cabinet was called "the government of the "not-no confidence", because it was externally supported by all the political parties in the Parliament, except for the neo-fascist Italian Social Movement.

=== Legislative action ===
On 28 January 1977, the Italian Parliament approved the Land Use Law. On 27 July 1978, the Fair Rent Law was enacted. As premier, Andeotti's urging of fellow leaders in the European Community was influential in the creation of an EU Regional Development Fund, which the south of Italy was to greatly benefit from.

In 1977, Andreotti dealt with an economic crisis by criticising the luxury lifestyle of many Italians and pushing through tough austerity measures. This cabinet fell in January 1978. In March, the crisis was overcome by the intervention of Moro, who proposed a new cabinet, again formed only by DC politicians, but this time with positive confidence votes from the other parties, including the PCI. This cabinet was also chaired by Andreotti and was formed on 16 March 1978.

=== Kidnapping of Aldo Moro ===
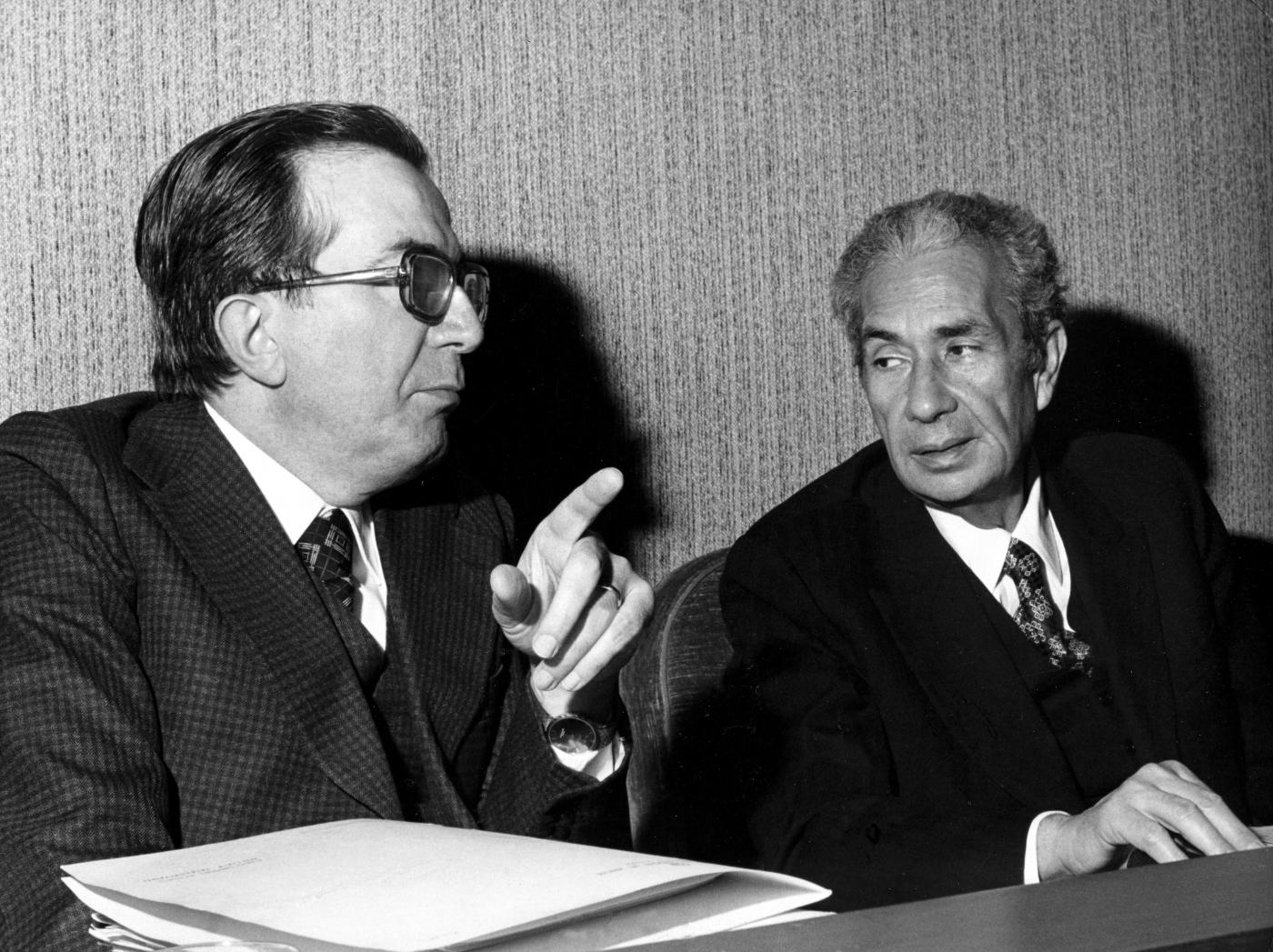
Andreotti with Aldo Moro

On the morning of 16 March 1978, the day on which the new Andreotti cabinet was supposed to have undergone a confidence vote in Parliament, the car of Aldo Moro, then-president of Christian Democracy, was assaulted by a group of Red Brigades (Italian: Brigate Rosse, or BR) terrorists in Via Fani in Rome. Firing automatic weapons, the terrorists killed Moro's bodyguards (two Carabinieri in Moro's car and three policemen in the following car) and kidnapped him.

During the kidnapping of Moro, Andreotti refused any negotiation with the terrorists. Moro, during his imprisonment, wrote a statement expressing very harsh judgements against Andreotti.

On 9 May 1978, Moro's body was found in the trunk of a Renault 4 in Via Caetani after 55 days of imprisonment, during which he was submitted to a political trial by the so-called "people's court" set up by the Brigate Rosse and the Italian government was asked for an exchange of prisoners. After Moro's death, Andreotti continued as Prime Minister of the "National Solidarity" government with the support of the PCI. Laws approved during his tenure included the Italian National Health Service reform. However, when the PCI asked to participate more directly in the government, Andreotti refused, and the government was dissolved in June 1979. Due also to conflict with Bettino Craxi, secretary of the Italian Socialist Party (PSI), the other main party in Italy at the time, Andreotti did not hold any further government position until 1983.

== Foreign Affairs Minister ==
In 1983, Andreotti became Minister of Foreign Affairs in the first Cabinet of Bettino Craxi, despite the long-lasting personal antagonism between the two men which had occurred earlier on; Craxi was the first Socialist to become Prime Minister of Italy since Unification.

=== Sigonella Crisis ===
On 7 October 1985, four men representing the Palestinian Liberation Front (PLF) hijacked the Italian MS Achille Lauro liner off the coast of Egypt, as she was sailing from Alexandria to Ashdod, Israel. The hijacking was organized by Muhammad Zaidan, leader of the PLF. One 69-year-old Jewish American man in a wheelchair, Leon Klinghoffer, was murdered by the hijackers and thrown overboard.

The Egyptian airliner carrying the hijackers was intercepted by F-14 Tomcats from the VF-74 "BeDevilers" and the VF-103 "Sluggers" of Carrier Air Wing 17, based on the aircraft carrier USS Saratoga, and directed to land at Naval Air Station Sigonella (a NATO air base in Sicily) under the orders of U.S. Secretary of Defense Caspar Weinberger; there, the hijackers were arrested by the Italian Carabinieri after a disagreement between American and Italian authorities. Prime Minister Bettino Craxi claimed Italian territorial rights over the NATO base. Italian Air Force personnel and Carabinieri lined up facing the United States Navy SEALs which had arrived with two C-141s. Other Carabinieri were sent from Catania to reinforce the Italians. The US eventually allowed the hijackers to be taken into Italian custody, after receiving assurances that the hijackers would be tried for murder. The other passengers on the plane (including Zaidan) were allowed to continue on to their destination, despite protests by the United States. Egypt demanded an apology from the U.S. for forcing the airplane off course.

The escape of Muhammad Zaidan was the result of a deal made with Yassar Arafat.

=== Policies ===
As Minister Andreotti encouraged diplomacy between the United States and the Soviet Union and improving Italian links with Arab countries. In this respect he followed a line similar to that of Craxi, with whom he had an otherwise troubled political relationship. The Italian authorities had banned the Lion of the Desert war film about the Second Italo-Senussi War during the Italian colonization of Libya, because, in the words of Andreotti, it was "damaging to the honor of the army".

On 14 April 1986, Andreotti revealed to Libyan Foreign Minister Abdel Rahman Shalgham that the United States would bomb Libya the next day in retaliation for the Berlin disco terrorist attack which had been linked to Libya. As a result of the warning from Italy – a supposed ally of the US – Libya was better prepared for the bombing. Nevertheless, on the following day, Libya fired two Scuds at the Italian island of Lampedusa in retaliation. However, the missiles passed over the island, landed in the sea and caused no damage. As Craxi's relationship with the then-National Secretary of the DC, Ciriaco De Mita, was even worse, Andreotti was instrumental in the creation of the so-called "CAF triangle" (from the initials of the surnames of Craxi, Andreotti and another DC leader, Arnaldo Forlani) opposing De Mita's power.

After Craxi's resignation in 1987, Andreotti remained Minister of Foreign Affairs in the governments of Fanfani and De Mita. In 1989, when De Mita's government fell, Andreotti was appointed as the new prime minister.

== Third term as prime minister ==
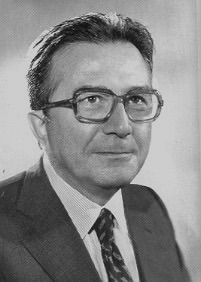
Portrait of Andreotti in the late 1970s

On 22 July 1989, Andreotti was sworn in for the third time as prime minister. A turbulent course characterized his government; he decided to stay at the head of government, despite the abandonment of many social democratic ministers, after the approval of the norm on TV spots favourable to private TV channels of Silvio Berlusconi. This choice did not prevent the resurgence of old suspicions and resentments with Bettino Craxi, whose Italian Socialist Party withdrew from their coalition government in 1991. Andreotti would create a new government consisting of Christian Democrats, Socialists, Social Democrats, and Liberals.

In 1990, Andreotti revealed the existence of the Operation Gladio; Gladio was the codename for a clandestine North Atlantic Treaty Organization (NATO) "stay-behind" operation in Italy during the Cold War. Its purpose was to prepare for and implement armed resistance in the event of a Warsaw Pact invasion and conquest. Although Gladio specifically refers to the Italian branch of the NATO stay-behind organizations, "Operation Gladio" is used as an informal name for all of them.

During his premiership, Andreotti clashed many times with the President of the Republic Francesco Cossiga.

=== European Union negotiations ===
In 1990, Andreotti was involved in getting all parties to agree to a binding timetable for the Maastricht Treaty. The deep Economic and Monetary Union of the European Union favoured by Italy was opposed by Britain's Margaret Thatcher, who wanted a system of competition between currencies. Germany had doubts about committing to the project without requiring economic reforms from Italy, which was seen as having various imbalances. As President of the European Council, Andreotti co-opted Germany by making admittance to the single market automatic once the criteria had been met and committing to a rigorous overhaul of Italian public finances. Critics later questioned Andreotti's understanding of the obligation or whether he had ever intended to fulfil it.

=== Resignation and decline ===
In 1992, at the end of the legislature, Andreotti resigned from premiership; he was the last Christian Democratic Prime Minister of Italy. The previous year, Cossiga had appointed him Senator for Life. Andreotti was one of the most likely candidates to succeed Cossiga as President of the Republic in the 1992 presidential election.

Andreotti and the members of his corrente had adopted a strategy of launching his candidature only after effectively quenching all the others. Allegations against him thwarted the strategy; moreover, the election was influenced by the murder of the anti-mafia magistrate Giovanni Falcone in Palermo.

== Later political life ==
=== Tangentopoli ===
In 1992, an investigation was started in Milan, dubbed Mani pulite. It uncovered endemic corruption practices at the highest levels, causing many spectacular (and sometimes controversial) arrests and resignations. After the disappointing result in the 1992 general election (29.7%) and two years of mounting scandals (which included several Mafia investigations which notably touched Andreotti), the Christian Democracy party was disbanded in 1994. In the 1990s, most of the politicians prosecuted were acquitted during those investigations, sometimes based on legal formalities or on statutory time limit rules.

=== After Christian Democracy ===
Christian Democracy suffered heavy defeats in the provincial and municipal elections, and polling suggested heavy losses in the 1994 Italian general election. In hopes of changing the party's image, the DC's last secretary, Mino Martinazzoli, decided to change the name of the party to the Italian People's Party (PPI). Pier Ferdinando Casini, representing the centre-right faction of the party (previously led by Forlani), decided to launch a new party called Christian Democratic Centre and form an alliance with Silvio Berlusconi's new party, Forza Italia. The left-wing faction either joined the Democratic Party of the Left or stayed within the new PPI, while some right-wingers joined National Alliance.

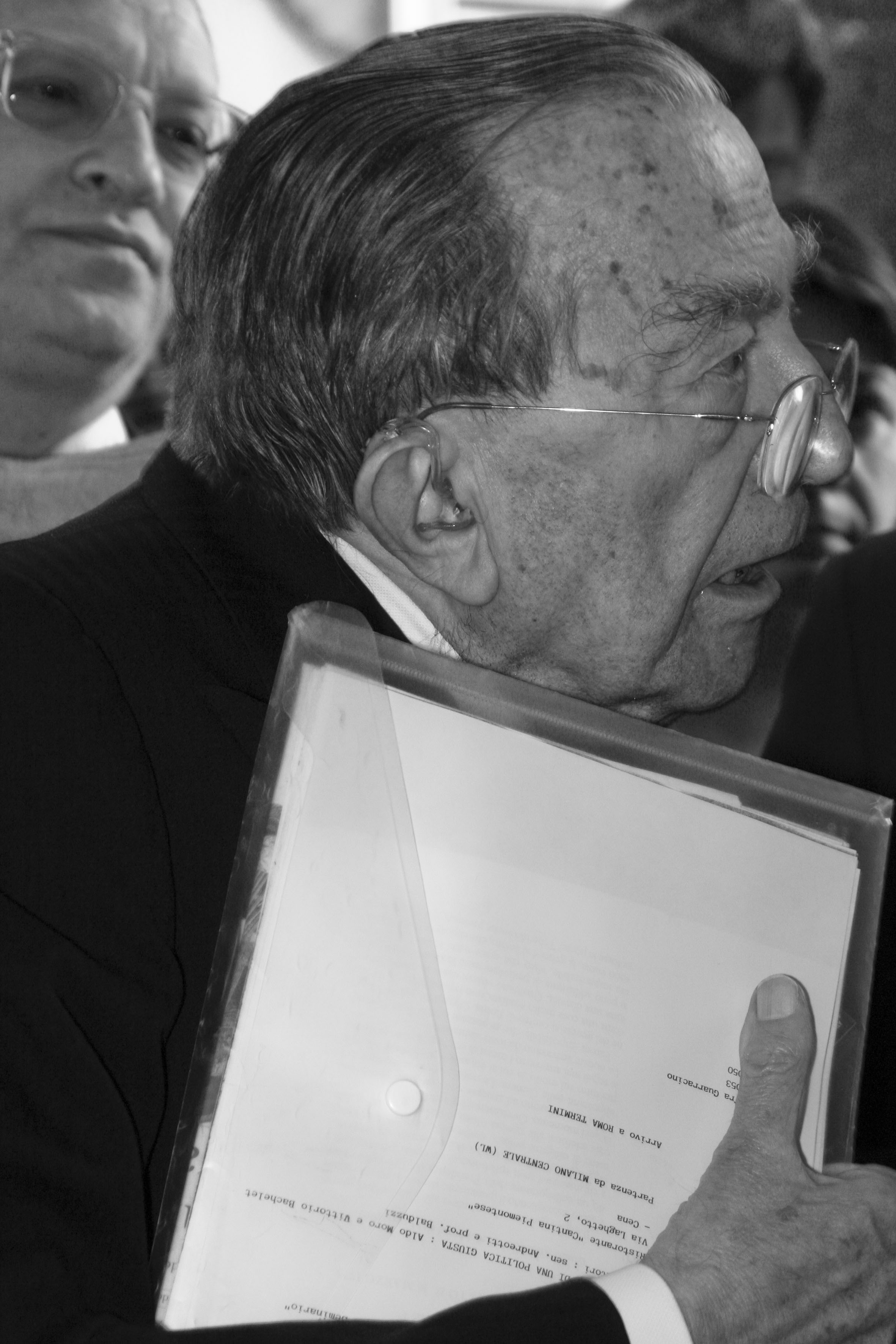
Andreotti in the late 2000s

Andreotti joined the PPI of Mino Martinazzoli. In 2001, after the creation of The Daisy, Andreotti abandoned the People's Party and joined the European Democracy, a minor Christian democratic political party in Italy, led by Sergio D'Antoni, former leader of the Italian Confederation of Workers' Trade Unions. Andreotti immediately became a prominent party member and was widely considered the de facto leader of the movement.

In the 2001 general election, the party scored 2.3% on a stand-alone list, winning only two seats in the Senate. In December 2002 it was merged with the Christian Democratic Centre and the United Christian Democrats to form the Union of Christian and Centre Democrats. Andreotti opposed this union and did not join the new party.

In 2006, Andreotti stood for the Presidency of the Italian Senate, obtaining 156 votes against the 165 of Franco Marini, former Labour Minister in the last Andreotti Cabinet. On 21 January 2008, he abstained from a vote in the Senate concerning Minister Massimo D'Alema's report on foreign politics. The abstentions of another life senator, Sergio Pininfarina, and of two Communist senators caused the government to lose the vote. Consequently, Prime Minister Romano Prodi resigned. On previous occasions, Andreotti had always supported Prodi's government with his vote.

During the 16th term of the Senate in 2008–2013, he opted to join the parliamentary group Union of the Centre – Independents of Pier Ferdinando Casini.

== Controversies ==
=== Trial for Mafia association ===
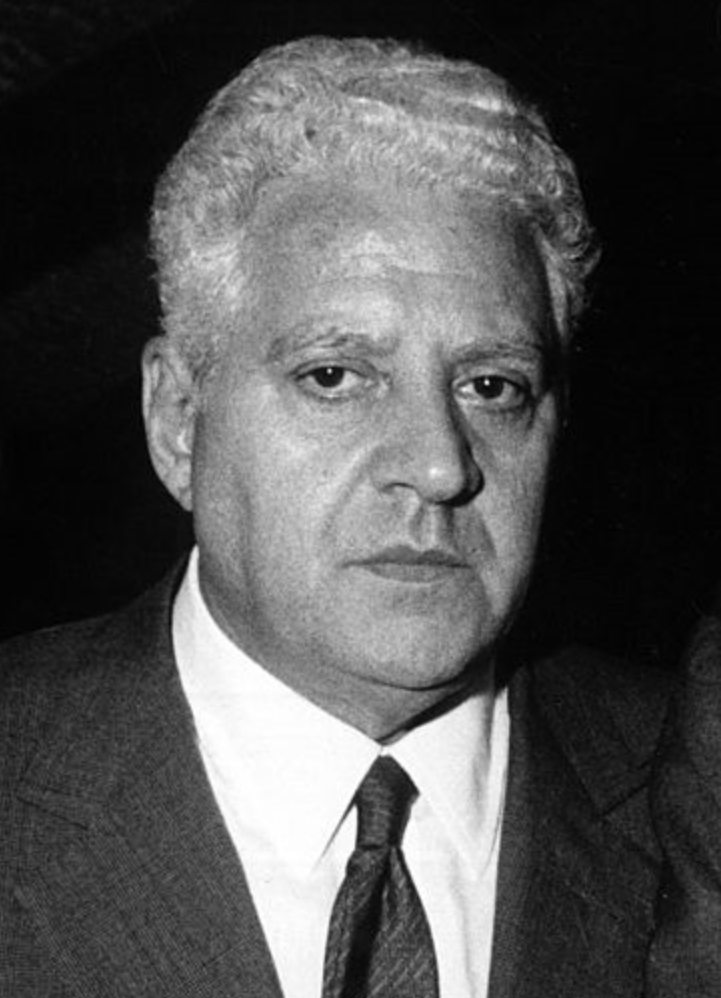
Salvatore Lima

Andreotti came under suspicion because his relatively small faction within the Christian Democrats included Sicilian Salvatore Lima. In Sicily, Lima cooperated with a Palermo-based Mafia, which operated below the surface of public life by controlling large numbers of votes to enable mutually beneficial relationships with local politicians. Andreotti said, "But Lima never spoke to me about these things." By the 1980s, the old low-profile Mafia was overthrown by the Corleonesi, an extremely violent faction led by fugitive Salvatore Riina. Whereas old Mafia bosses had been cautious about violence, Riina's targeting of anti-mafia officials proved ever more counter-productive. The 1982 murders of parliamentarian Pio La Torre and Carabinieri general Carlo Alberto Dalla Chiesa led to the Maxi Trial. Prosecutors, who could not be disciplined or removed except by their self-government board, the CSM, were given increased powers. After January 1992 upholding of the Maxi Trial verdicts as definitive convictions by the supreme court, Riina embarked on a renewed campaign which claimed the lives of the prosecuting magistrates, Giovanni Falcone and Paolo Borsellino, and their police guards. As Riina intended, the assassination of Falcone discredited Andreotti and prevented him from becoming Italy's president. It also led to prosecutors being seen as epitomising civic virtue. In January 1993, Riina was arrested in Palermo. In the aftermath of Riina's capture, there were further Mafia bomb outrages that included terror attacks on art galleries and churches, which killed ten among the audience and led to a weakening of rules on the evidence which prosecutors could use to bring charges.

Labelled by Italian media as the "trial of the century", legal action against Andreotti began on 27 March 1993 in Palermo. The prosecution accused the former prime minister of "[making] available to the mafia association named Cosa Nostra for the defence of its interests and attainment of its criminal goals, the influence and power coming from his position as the leader of a political faction". Prosecutors said in return for electoral support of Lima and assassination of Andreotti's enemies, he had agreed to protect the Mafia, which had expected him to fix the Maxi Trial. Andreotti's defence was predicated on character attacks against the prosecution's key witnesses, who were themselves involved with the mafia. This created a "his word against theirs" dynamic between a prominent politician and a handful of criminals. The defence said Andreotti had been a long-time politician of national stature, never beholden to Lima; and that far from providing protection, Andreotti had passed many tough anti-mafia laws when in government during the '80s. According to Andreotti's lawyers, the prosecution case was based on conjecture and inference, without any concrete proof of direct involvement by Andreotti. The defence also contended the prosecution relied on the word of mafia turncoats whose evidence had been contradictory. One such informer testified that Riina and Andreotti had met and exchanged a "kiss of honour". It emerged that the informer had received a US$300,000 "bonus" and committed a number of murders while in the witness protection programme. Andreotti dismissed the allegation against him as "lies and slander ... the kiss of Riina, mafia summits ... scenes out of a comic horror film".

Andreotti was eventually acquitted on 23 October 1999; however, together with the greater series of corruption cases of Mani pulite, Andreotti's trials marked the purging and renewal of Italy's political system.

==== Andreotti's absolution and statute of limitations ====
Andreotti was tried in Palermo for criminal association until 28 September 1982 and mafia association from 29 September 1982 onwards. While the first-degree sentence, issued on 23 October 1999, acquitted him because the fact did not exist on the basis of article 530, paragraph 2, of the Penal Code, the appeal sentence, issued on 2 May 2003, distinguishing between the facts up to 1980 and those that followed, established that Andreotti "had committed" the "offence of participation in the criminal association" (Cosa Nostra), "concretely recognisable until the spring of 1980", an offence that was "extinguished by statute of limitations". For facts subsequent to the spring of 1980, Andreotti was acquitted.

Both the prosecution and the defence appealed to the Court of Cassation, one against the acquittal, and the other to try to obtain an acquittal even on the facts until 1980, instead of a statute of limitations. On 15 October 2004, the Court of Cassation rejected both requests, confirming the statute of limitations for any offence until the spring of 1980 and acquittal for the rest. The grounds for the appeal judgment read (on page 211): "Therefore the appealed sentence ... has recognized the participation in the associative crime not in the reductive terms of mere availability, but in the widest and juridically significant ones of a concrete collaboration." It quotes the opinion of the Court of Appeal and is immediately followed by another sentence of the Court of Cassation: "The reconstruction of single episodes and the evaluation of their consequences were made per comments and interpretations that can also be not shared and against which other ones can be relied on." Suppose the final judgment had arrived by 20 December 2002 (limitation period). In that case, it could have resulted in one of the following two alternative outcomes:

- Andreotti could have been convicted based on article 416 of the Penal Code, i.e. the "simple" association, since the aggravated mafia-type association (416-bis of the Penal Code) was introduced in the Italian Penal Code only in 1982, thanks to the rapporteurs Virginio Rognoni (DC) and Pio La Torre. (PCI).
- The defendant could have been acquitted in full with the confirmation of the first instance judgment.

In 2010, the Court of Cassation ruled that Andreotti had slandered a judge who had given testimony by saying the self-governing body of prosecutors and judges should remove him from his position. Andreotti had said that leaving the man as a judge was "like leaving a lighted fuse in the hand of a child".

=== Trial for murder ===
Carmine Pecorelli's dead body in his Citroën CX in 1979

Contemporaneously with his trial for Mafia association, Andreotti was tried in Perugia with Sicilian Mafia boss Gaetano Badalamenti, Massimo Carminati, and others on charges of complicity in the murder of journalist Mino Pecorelli. The case was circumstantial and based on the word of Mafia turncoat Tommaso Buscetta, who had not originally mentioned the allegation about Andreotti when interviewed by Giovanni Falcone and had recanted it by the time of the trial.

Mino Pecorelli was killed in Rome's Prati district with four gunshots, on 20 March 1979. The bullets used to kill him were Gevelot brand, a peculiarly rare type of bullet not easily found on gun markets, legal and clandestine alike. The same kind of bullet was later found in the Banda della Magliana's weapon stock, concealed in the Health Ministry's basement. Investigations targeted Massimo Carminati, member of the far-right organization Nuclei Armati Rivoluzionari (NAR) and of the Banda della Magliana, the head of Propaganda Due, Licio Gelli, Antonio Viezzer, Cristiano Fioravanti and Valerio Fioravanti.

On 6 April 1993, Mafia turncoat Tommaso Buscetta told Palermo prosecutors that he had learnt from his boss Gaetano Badalamenti that Pecorelli's murder had been carried out in the interest of Andreotti. The Salvo cousins, two powerful Sicilian politicians with deep ties to local Mafia families, were also involved in the murder. Buscetta testified that Gaetano Badalamenti told him that the Salvo cousins had commissioned the murder as a favour to Andreotti. Andreotti was allegedly afraid that Pecorelli was about to publish information that could have destroyed his political career. Among the information was the complete memorial of Aldo Moro, which would be published only in 1990 and which Pecorelli had shown to General Carlo Alberto Dalla Chiesa before his death. Dalla Chiesa was also assassinated by Mafia in September 1982.

Andreotti was acquitted along with his co-defendants in 1999. Local prosecutors successfully appealed the acquittal, and there was a retrial, which in 2002 convicted Andreotti and sentenced him to 24 years imprisonment. Italians of all political allegiances denounced the conviction. Many failed to understand how the court could convict Andreotti of orchestrating the killing, yet acquit his co-accused, who supposedly had carried out his orders by setting up and committing the murder. The Italian supreme court definitively acquitted Andreotti of the murder in 2003.

== Personal life ==
On 16 April 1945, Andreotti married Livia Danese (1 June 1921 – 29 July 2015) and had two sons and two daughters, Lamberto (born 6 July 1950), Marilena, Stefano and Serena.

== Death and legacy ==
Andreotti said the opinion of others was of little consequence to him, and "In any case, a few years from now, no one will remember me." He died in Rome on 6 May 2013 after suffering from respiratory problems, at the age of 94. The BBC described him as "one of the most prominent political figures of post-war Italy". The New York Times noted he had "a résumé of signal accomplishments and checkered failings that reads like a history of the republic". The Mayor of Rome, Gianni Alemanno, announced the death, stating that Andreotti was "the most representative politician" Italy had known in its recent history.

=== Conspiracy theories ===
Andreotti was accused of participating in a variety of plots. He was alleged to be the éminence grise behind the Propaganda Due Masonic Lodge, a secret association of politicians, civil servants, industrialists, military leaders, heads of the secret service, and prominent journalists conspiring to prevent the Italian Communist Party taking office. This theory posited control of elements ranging from the neo-fascist Valerio Fioravanti to Rome gangsters the Banda della Magliana and to Operation Gladio, a clandestine NATO organisation that was intended to fight a Soviet conquest of Europe through an armed resistance movement.

Andreotti was also accused of having a hand in the death of Aldo Moro and terrorist massacres in a strategy of tension aimed at precipitating a coup, as well as banking scandals and various high-profile assassinations.

==== Related perceptions of Andreotti ====
Cover of the Italian weekly Panorama featuring Andreotti

Fictional characters have been influenced by his image as a Machiavellian. A retort that Andreotti made in reply to an inquiry if being in power was wearing him out, "Power wears out those who don't have it", was used in the film The Godfather Part III, where a powerful Mafia-linked politician is shown laughing at the comment just before his assassination. He was nicknamed Belzebù (Beelzebub) or "The Devil himself" by Bettino Craxi, a political opponent who later fled Italy while sought on corruption charges. Other disparaging nicknames included "The Black Pope" and "The Hunchback" (he had a malformed spine). Although relatively tall for an Italian of his generation, cartoonists sometimes portrayed Andreotti as a hunchback dwarf lurking in the background.

A joke about Andreotti (originally seen in a strip by Stefano Disegni and Massimo Caviglia) had him receiving a phone call from a fellow party member, who pleaded with him to attend judge Giovanni Falcone's funeral. His friend supposedly begged, "The State must give an answer to the Mafia, and you are one of the top authorities in it!" To which a puzzled Andreotti asked, "Which one do you mean?"

In 2008, Andreotti became the subject of Paolo Sorrentino's film Il Divo, which portrayed him as a glib, unsympathetic figure, in whose orbit people tended to meet untimely and unnatural deaths. He reportedly lost his temper when he first saw the film but later joked, "I'm happy for the producer. And I'd be even happier if I had a share of the takings."

Andreotti was depicted in the 2020 film Rose Island, which tells the story of the Republic of Rose Island, played by Marco Sincini.

== Electoral history ==
Election	House	Constituency	Party	Votes	Result
1946	Constituent Assembly	Rome–Viterbo–Latina–Frosinone	DC	25,261	Elected
1948	Chamber of Deputies	Rome–Viterbo–Latina–Frosinone	DC	169,476	Elected
1953	Chamber of Deputies	Rome–Viterbo–Latina–Frosinone	DC	145,318	Elected
1958	Chamber of Deputies	Rome–Viterbo–Latina–Frosinone	DC	227,007	Elected
1963	Chamber of Deputies	Rome–Viterbo–Latina–Frosinone	DC	203,521	Elected
1968	Chamber of Deputies	Rome–Viterbo–Latina–Frosinone	DC	252,369	Elected
1972	Chamber of Deputies	Rome–Viterbo–Latina–Frosinone	DC	367,235	Elected
1976	Chamber of Deputies	Rome–Viterbo–Latina–Frosinone	DC	191,593	Elected
1979	Chamber of Deputies	Rome–Viterbo–Latina–Frosinone	DC	302,745	Elected
1983	Chamber of Deputies	Rome–Viterbo–Latina–Frosinone	DC	206,944	Elected
1987	Chamber of Deputies	Rome–Viterbo–Latina–Frosinone	DC	329,599	Elected

Political offices
Preceded by Paolo Cappa	Secretary of the Council of Ministers; 1947–1954	Succeeded by Mariano Rumor
Preceded by Amintore Fanfani	Minister of the Interior; 1954	Succeeded by Mario Scelba
Preceded by Roberto Tremelloni	Minister of Finance; 1955–1958	Succeeded by Luigi Preti
Preceded by Giuseppe Medici	Minister of Treasury; 1958–1959	Succeeded by Fernando Tambroni
Preceded by Antonio Segni	Minister of Defence; 1959–1966	Succeeded by Roberto Tremelloni
Preceded by Edgardo Lami Starnuti	Minister of Trade, Industry and Crafts; 1966–1968	Succeeded by Mario Tanassi
Preceded by Emilio Colombo	Prime Minister of Italy; 1972–1973	Succeeded by Mariano Rumor
Preceded by Mario Tanassi	Minister of Defence; 1974	Succeeded by Arnaldo Forlani
Preceded by Antonio Giolitti	Minister of Budget and Economic Planning; 1974–1976	Succeeded by Tommaso Morlino
Preceded by Aldo Moro	Prime Minister of Italy; 1976–1979	Succeeded by Francesco Cossiga
Preceded by Emilio Colombo	Minister of Foreign Affairs; 1983–1989	Succeeded by Gianni De Michelis
Preceded by Ciriaco De Mita	Prime Minister of Italy; 1989–1992	Succeeded by Giuliano Amato
Preceded by Franco Piga	Minister of State Holdings; 1990–1992	Succeeded by Giuseppe Guarino
Preceded by Ferdinando Facchiano	Minister for Cultural Heritage and Environment; 1991–1992	Succeeded by Alberto Ronchey
Awards
Preceded by Luciano De Crescenzo	Recipient of the Bancarella Price; 1985	Succeeded by Pasquale Festa Campanile
