= IFM Therapeutics =

Pharmaceutical company

IFM Therapeutics, LLC
- Formerly: IFM (2016–2018)
- Company type: Private
- Industry: Pharmaceutical
- Founded: 2015; 11 years ago in Cambridge, Massachusetts
- Key people: Gary Glick (CEO); Jean-Francoise Formela (Chairman)
- Subsidiaries: IFM Due
- Website: ifmthera.com

IFM Therapeutics is a pharmaceutical company focused on developing biological treatments for autoimmune diseases.

IFM Therapeutics launched in 2015 in Cambridge, Massachusetts, based on seed funding from the Boston-based venture capital fund Atlas Venture. The company's founding involved seven people, a mix of executives and university professors. Series A financing was provided by Atlas, London-based Abingworth, and Swiss pharmaceutical company Novartis.

The company was originally formed with a dual development path, focusing on both autoimmune diseases and cancer immunotherapy. However, in 2017, the entire development program devoted to enhancing the body's innate immune response to cancer was purchased by Bristol-Myers Squibb, which set up a new company from this purchase and recruited IFM's CEO, Gary Glick, to head the new company. This purchase was notable in both its speed following IFM's establishment, and the payment—ten-times the Series A funding injection.

The following year, in 2018, Boston-based IFM Tre formed with the spin-out of research and assets specifically related to blocking the NLRP3 complex, a so-called inflammasome. This spin-out, described as a subsidiary, subsequently secured funding from a familiar set of sources: Atlas, Abingworth, and Bristol-Myers Squibb. The rest of the company remained as a limited-liability company, from which it was anticipated further research spin-outs might take place. IFM Tre's leadership included Gary Glick and H. Martin Seidel, formerly of Novartis.

An alternative view on the 2018, purchase by Bristol-Myers Squibb has characterized it as a straightforward acquisition of IFM, with remaining assets going to form IFM Therapeutics, which spawned two subsidiaries, IFM Tre and IFM Due, the latter focused on development of cGAS/STING antagonists. IFM Tre was subsequently bought by Novartis in 2019.

== Governance ==
Gary Glick was tapped to be the company's chief executive officer during its initial formation. Glick founded a spin-out immunotherapy firm from the University of Michigan in 2006, Lycera, and served as the company's chief scientific officer until joining IFM. Two other C-suite members at the outset were Dennis Dean, chief development officer, formerly of Vertex; and Shomir Gosh, chief scientific officer, formerly of Tempero Pharmaceuticals. Gosh left IFM in 2018 for the post of chief scientific officer at the Harvard spin-out firm 28-7 Therapeutics. In 2017, Martin Seidel joined IFM as the head of R&D, coming from an executive position at Novartis. IFM's chairman was also an Atlas partner, Jean-François Formela, and an additional board member, Vincent Miles, came from Abingworth, the other major venture capital firm supporting IFM.
