= Lamberto Andreotti =

Italian businessman (born 1950)

- Born: 6 July 1950 (age 76); Rome, Italy
- Education: Sapienza University of Rome (BS); Massachusetts Institute of Technology (MS)
- Occupation: Business executive
- Board member of: Bristol-Myers Squibb (2009–2015); DuPont (since 2012); UniCredit (since 2018)
- Parents: Giulio Andreotti (father); Livia Danese (mother)

Lamberto Andreotti (born 6 July 1950) is an Italian businessman. He is currently executive chairman of the board of Bristol Myers Squibb.

== Biography ==
=== Early life ===
Andreotti was born in Rome, Italy, in 1950, the son of Italian Senator and President of the Council of Ministers Giulio Andreotti. He graduated from Sapienza University of Rome with a degree in engineering; he then earned a Master of Science degree from Massachusetts Institute of Technology.

=== Professional roles ===
He worked for many pharmaceutical companies, including Farmitalia-Carlo Erba then with Pharmacia after Pharmacia acquired Farmitalia.

In 1998, he joined Bristol-Myers Squibb as vice president and general manager of European Oncology and Italy. He was elected to the Board of Directors in March 2009, and became CEO on 4 May 2010. Prior to taking the role of CEO, he held the role of president and COO. He retired from Bristol-Myers Squibb in 2015 and took on the role of executive chairman of the company's board, succeeding James M. Cornelius who was retiring from this role.

He was elected to the board of DuPont in 2012.

He was elected to the Board of Directors of UniCredit S.p.A. Bank on 12 May 2018.
