= Danicamtiv =

Chemical compound

Clinical data
- Other names: MYK-491

Legal status
- Legal status: Investigational

Identifiers
- IUPAC name: 4-[(1R)-1-[3-(Difluoromethyl)-1-methylpyrazol-4-yl]sulfonyl-1-fluoroethyl]-N-(1,2-oxazol-3-yl)piperidine-1-carboxamide
- CAS Number: 1970972-74-7
- PubChem CID: 122424426
- ChemSpider: 81367782
- UNII: 7B2CS922HI
- KEGG: D11824
- ChEMBL: ChEMBL4594304

Chemical and physical data
- Formula: C_{16}H_{20}F_{3}N_{5}O_{4}S
- Molar mass: 435.42 g·mol^{−1}
- 3D model (JSmol): Interactive image
- SMILES: C[C@@](C1CCN(CC1)C(=O)NC2=NOC=C2)(F)S(=O)(=O)C3=CN(N=C3C(F)F)C
- InChI: InChI=1S/C16H20F3N5O4S/c1-16(19,29(26,27)11-9-23(2)21-13(11)14(17)18)10-3-6-24(7-4-10)15(25)20-12-5-8-28-22-12/h5,8-10,14H,3-4,6-7H2,1-2H3,(H,20,22,25)/t16-/m1/s1; Key:NREKKBAMVWQRES-MRXNPFEDSA-N

Danicamtiv is a cardiac myosin activator developed by Bristol Myers Squibb to treat dilated cardiomyopathy.
