= Lulizumab pegol =

Monoclonal antibody

Monoclonal antibody
- Type: ?
- Source: Humanized
- Target: glycoprotein CD28

Clinical data
- Other names: BMS-931699
- ATC code: none

Identifiers
- CAS Number: 1421830-13-8
- IUPHAR/BPS: 8460
- ChemSpider: none
- UNII: LCT264LTYE

Chemical and physical data
- Formula: C_{552}H_{859}N_{149}O_{164}S_{4}
- Molar mass: 12335.06 g·mol^{−1}

Lulizumab pegol (INN; development code BMS-931699) is a monoclonal antibody developed by Bristol-Myers Squibb for the treatment of autoimmune diseases such as cutaneous lupus erythematosus.
