= Prostvac =

Prostate cancer vaccine

Vaccine description
- Target: Prostate cancer

Clinical data
- Routes of administration: subcutaneous injection

Identifiers
- CAS Number: 947602-09-7
- PubChem SID: 534055
- ChemSpider: none

PROSTVAC (rilimogene galvacirepvec/rilimogene glafolivec) is a cancer immunotherapy candidate in clinical development by Bavarian Nordic for the treatment of all prostate cancer although clinical trials are focusing on more advanced cases of metastatic castration-resistant prostate cancer (mCRPC). PROSTVAC is a vaccine designed to enable the immune system to recognize and attack prostate cancer cells by triggering a specific and targeted T cell immune response to cancer cells that express the tumor-associated antigen prostate-specific antigen (PSA).

PROSTVAC utilizes recombinant poxviruses that express PSA, along with 3 immune-enhancing costimulatory molecules collectively designated as TRICOM (LFA-3, ICAM-1, and B7.1) to stimulate an immune response. Treatment is initiated by subcutaneous administration of a priming dose of vaccinia encoding PSA-TRICOM, followed by 6 subsequent boosting doses of fowlpox encoding the same PSA-TRICOM cassette. Using this heterologous prime-boost dosing regimen, the immune system becomes focused on inducing PSA-specific T cell responses, designed to kill tumor cells expressing PSA.

== Clinical development ==
PROSTVAC is being developed in partnership with the National Cancer Institute under a formal Cooperative Research and Development Agreement and has been the subject of multiple ongoing and completed clinical studies, including the global Phase 3 PROSPECT study underway in patients with asymptomatic or minimally symptomatic metastatic prostate cancer (mCRPC). This Phase 3 study is designed to validate positive clinical data from a randomized, controlled, double-blind Phase 2 clinical trial that enrolled 125 minimally symptomatic mCRPC patients. The Phase 2 study's secondary endpoint demonstrated that patients who received PROSTVAC had a median overall survival that was 9.9 months longer than the control group (26.2 versus 16.3 months)(p. < .01) and a reduction in the risk of death. PROSTVAC was generally well tolerated, with the most common side effects including injection site reactions, fever, fatigue, and nausea.

Based on non-clinical data supporting the scientific rationale for combination therapy with PROSTVAC, additional clinical trials are underway to evaluate the potential clinical benefit of combining PROSTVAC with different treatment modalities such as hormonal therapies (e.g. androgen inhibitors), radiopharmaceuticals and immune checkpoint inhibitors in the treatment of prostate cancer.

== Commercialization ==
In 2015, Bristol-Myers Squibb obtained from Bavarian Nordic an "exclusive option to license and commercialize Prostvac". Under a separate agreement, Bavarian Nordic would "undertake the future commercial manufacturing of Prostvac".
