= BMS-906024 =

Chemical compound

Identifiers
- IUPAC name: (2R,3S)-N-[(3S)-1-Methyl-2-oxo-5-phenyl-2,3-dihydro-1H-1,4-benzodiazepin-3-yl]-2,3-bis(3,3,3-trifluoropropyl)succinamide
- CAS Number: 1401066-79-2
- PubChem CID: 66550890
- PubChem SID: 152143555
- ChemSpider: 28536138
- UNII: DRL23N424R
- CompTox Dashboard (EPA): DTXSID30161234

Chemical and physical data
- Formula: C_{26}H_{26}F_{6}N_{4}O_{3}
- Molar mass: 556.509 g·mol^{−1}
- 3D model (JSmol): Interactive image
- SMILES: CN1c2ccccc2C(=N[C@@H](C1=O)NC(=O)[C@H](CCC(F)(F)F)[C@H](CCC(F)(F)F)C(=O)N)c3ccccc3
- InChI: InChI=1S/C26H26F6N4O3/c1-36-19-10-6-5-9-18(19)20(15-7-3-2-4-8-15)34-22(24(36)39)35-23(38)17(12-14-26(30,31)32)16(21(33)37)11-13-25(27,28)29/h2-10,16-17,22H,11-14H2,1H3,(H2,33,37)(H,35,38)/t16-,17+,22+/m0/s1; Key:AYOUDDAETNMCBW-GSHUGGBRSA-N

BMS-906024 is a drug with a benzodiazepine structure, developed by Bristol-Myers Squibb and disclosed at the spring 2013 American Chemical Society meeting in New Orleans to treat breast, lung, colon cancers and leukemia. The drug works as a pan-Notch inhibitor. The structure is one of a set patented in 2012, and is being studied in clinical trials.
