= Glibenclamide/metformin =

Combination drug

Combination of
- Glibenclamide: Sulfonylurea
- Metformin: Biguanide

Clinical data
- Trade names: Glucovance
- AHFS/Drugs.com: Monograph
- MedlinePlus: a699055
- License data: US DailyMed: Glyburide_and_metformin_hydrochloride
- Pregnancy category: AU: C
- Routes of administration: By mouth
- ATC code: None

Legal status
- Legal status: AU: S4 (Prescription only); US: ℞-only

Identifiers
- CAS Number: 338752-31-1
- KEGG: D10266

Glibenclamide/metformin, also known as glyburide/metformin and sold under the brand name Glucovance, is a fixed-dose combination anti-diabetic medication used to treat type 2 diabetes. It contains glibenclamide, a sulfonylurea, and metformin, a biguanide.
