= Cimlanod =

Chemical compound

Legal status
- Legal status: Investigational

Identifiers
- IUPAC name: N-Hydroxy-5-methylfuran-2-sulfonamide
- CAS Number: 1620330-72-4
- PubChem CID: 76685198
- DrugBank: DB14983
- ChemSpider: 68007456
- UNII: 2US4FK1EPV
- KEGG: D11407
- ChEMBL: ChEMBL4297915
- CompTox Dashboard (EPA): DTXSID801288087

Chemical and physical data
- Formula: C_{5}H_{7}NO_{4}S
- Molar mass: 177.17 g·mol^{−1}
- 3D model (JSmol): Interactive image
- SMILES: CC1=CC=C(O1)S(=O)(=O)NO
- InChI: InChI=1S/C5H7NO4S/c1-4-2-3-5(10-4)11(8,9)6-7/h2-3,6-7H,1H3; Key:LIXKIXWSKOENAB-UHFFFAOYSA-N

Cimlanod (development codes CXL-1427 and BMS-986231) is an experimental drug for the treatment of acute decompensated heart failure. It was discovered by Cardioxyl Pharmaceuticals, which was acquired by Bristol-Myers Squibb. It is a precursor of nitroxyl.

Cimlanod is a prodrug of CXL-1020.

A preliminary study showed efficacy in patients with class III and IV heart failure. A phase II clinical trial was completed in 2016.
