= Obexelimab =

Experimental drug

Monoclonal antibody
- Type: ?
- Target: CD19 and Fc gamma receptor IIb

Clinical data
- Other names: AMG 729

Legal status
- Legal status: Investigational

Identifiers
- CAS Number: 1690307-05-1
- DrugBank: DB15032
- UNII: RM16A4BA8R

Obexelimab is an experimental drug developed to treat IgG4-related disease and lupus. It works as a "bifunctional, non-cytolytic, humanised monoclonal antibody that binds CD19 and Fc gamma receptor IIb to inhibit B cells, plasmablasts, and CD19-expressing plasma cells."
