= Malaysian Physics Institute =

Malaysian research organization

Malaysian Physics Institute Institut Fizik Malaysia
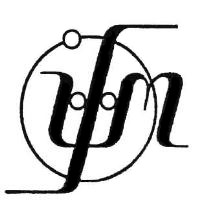
- Formation: 1973
- President: Kurunathan A/L Ratnavelu
- Website: ifm.htm

The Malaysian Physics Institute (Institut Fizik Malaysia) is the sole representative body for physicists and for those involved in the practice of physics or physics related work in Malaysia.

== Objectives ==
1. promotion of the advancement of physics.
2. promotion of activities that will bring together members to co-operate in the fields of education, training and practice of physics
3. elevation of the professional status of physicist.

== History ==
The need for a single body to represent the growing number of physicists in the country was felt by many since the early sixties. Although most physicists in the universities were member of the UK Institute of Physics, the majority of physicists, especially teachers and those in the research and service sectors, were not. The first interim committee met in Kuala Lumpur in 1971. The Institute's constitution was later formally approved and the Institut Fizik Malaysia was thus established in 1973 with an initial membership of 35. Although the growth of the institute was initially slow, by 2009 the number of members exceeded 1200, reflecting the continuing acceptance and support of the institute by the country's physics community.

== Activities ==
The Institut Fizik Malaysia organises conferences, seminars courses, workshops and meetings on issues which are not only of current interest to physicists, but also on issues which highlight the important role of physics in the country's development. The National Physics Symposium is held once every two years. Here physicists meet to discuss issues pertaining to the many areas of physics. International and regional meetings are also organised. Special courses are held from time to time, e.g., courses on microcomputers, lasers, plasmas, etc.

The Institute publishes a quarterly journal (Jurnal Fizik Malaysia) to report up-to-date research findings in physics. A newsletter, Berita Fizik, is published quarterly to report current and future activities of the Institute. A magazine, Majalah Fizik, is biannual and contains popular articles.

== Associations ==
The Institut Fizik Malaysia is a member and associate of multiple Associations:

- A member entity of the Asia Pacific Center for Theoretical Physics
- A member of the Association of Asia Pacific Physical Societies
- A member of the Confederation of Scientific and Technological Associations in Malaysia
- An associate member of the Asia Oceania Forum for Synchrotron Radiation Research

The Institut Fizik Malaysia also cooperates with most other physics institutes/organisations of other countries.
