= Abingworth (company) =

Venture capital firm

Abingworth LLP
- Formerly: Abingworth Management Ltd
- Industry: Bioscience investment firm
- Founded: 1973; 53 years ago
- Founders: Peter Dicks; Hon. Anthony Montagu
- Headquarters: London, UK
- Owner: Independent (1973–2022); The Carlyle Group (2022–present)
- Website: www.abingworth.com

Abingworth LLP (formerly Abingworth Management Ltd.) is a transatlantic bioscience investment firm founded in 1973 by a pair of London stockbrokers, Peter Dicks and Hon. Anthony Montagu. Abingworth had initially sought to extend its investments into the biotechnology industry in the late 1980s, and has subsequently been investing in life science and healthcare services companies since at least 2001, and had expanded to include information technology firm investments by 2016.

In August 2022, Abingworth was acquired by The Carlyle Group.

== Offices ==
In addition to its base in London, the company had a second office in Palo Alto as of 2001. By 2016, the Palo Alto office had been replaced by an office in Menlo Park, and an additional offices had been established in Boston and Cambridge.

== Investments ==
The company's investment strategy involves the establishment of funds with particular investment targets in mind. For instance, the "Bioventures VI" fund was "closed" in March 2014, having accrued $375 million, reportedly exceeding the "target" for the fund. A key element in the firm's investment strategy is the exit, which signifies the acquisition of or initial public offering by a company in which the firm has invested.

Prior to 1987, Abingworth had made investments, considered by 2016 to have been successful, in Apple and Silicon Graphics.

The firm created its biotech investment arm in 1987. Among the first investments was in Immunology Ltd, which was later renamed to Cantab Pharmaceuticals. In 2000, the company joined several others in providing funding for Oxagen. In the early 2000s, the firm invested in and saw forward to initial public offering a number of firms, including Dicerna Pharmaceuticals and Clovis Oncology. The firm has also provided funding to support the acquisition of Algeta by Bayer and Avila Therapeutics by Celgene. In the Algeta case, this was the very first of the firm's venture investments in public equities, dating to February 2009.

In 2013, the firm realised an exit from investment in Syntaxin Ltd when it was acquired by Ipsen SA.

In 2013, the firm invested in Effector Therapeutics. It also, in January 2013, set up Avillion Group Partners, a clinical phase III co-development accelerator, with Massachusetts-based Clarus Ventures. Following from this, Avillion partnered with Pfizer on a label expansion effort for Bosulif.

In 2014, the firm invested in two ophthalmic companies, Avedro and Gensight Biologics.

== Corporate details ==
As of 2001, Abingworth had less than 10 employees. and the company managed $300 million across several funds and had provided capital to sixty life science companies..

By 2014, the managed value of one of the firm's ten funds was $375 million.

As of 2016, there were two managing partners, Timothy J. Haines and Kurt von Emster. and the firm had grown to over 20 employees.

"Special partner" David Leathers joined the firm in 1987, having left Rothschild. James Abell has held the post of chief financial officer since at least 2001. The company also has a board of directors, which consisted of two members in 2016, Stephen Bunting and Theodore Clark. Bunting had been a managing partner from 2002 to at least 2014, having joined Abingworth in 1987 after leaving Rothschild with Leathers. By 2014, Bunting had been involved in the establishment each of the ten (at that time) of the company's life science investment funds.

== Acquisition ==
In August 2022, Abingworth was acquired by The Carlyle Group. At the time of the acquisition, Abingworth had approximately $2 billion in assets under management.
