= Keri Lotion =

Brand of moisturising lotion

Keri is an American brand of moisturizing lotion that was introduced by Novartis Consumer Health. The brand has traditionally included different types of Keri Lotion such as Keri- Original, Keri- Advanced, Keri- Shea Butter, Keri- Basic Essential, Keri- Luxurious, and Keri- moisture rich oil. Keri lotion was a product of Westwood Pharmaceutical of Buffalo, New York. It was later purchased by Bristol-Myers Squibb.

== History ==
Keri Lotion was first introduced by Westwood Pharmaceuticals to the American public in 1960. Keri lotion was put into doctor offices and hospitals, which was how the product was promoted. In 1998, Bristol Myers spent $6 million on advertising its original Keri Brand. In 1999, it was expected to double.

Keri Lotion is now owned by Crown Laboratories, who purchased it on May 1, 2019.
